

82001–82100 

|-bgcolor=#d6d6d6
| 82001 ||  || — || August 20, 2000 || Anderson Mesa || LONEOS || THM || align=right | 4.8 km || 
|-id=002 bgcolor=#d6d6d6
| 82002 ||  || — || August 20, 2000 || Anderson Mesa || LONEOS || — || align=right | 4.2 km || 
|-id=003 bgcolor=#d6d6d6
| 82003 ||  || — || August 20, 2000 || Anderson Mesa || LONEOS || — || align=right | 7.7 km || 
|-id=004 bgcolor=#d6d6d6
| 82004 ||  || — || August 20, 2000 || Anderson Mesa || LONEOS || EOS || align=right | 7.5 km || 
|-id=005 bgcolor=#d6d6d6
| 82005 ||  || — || September 1, 2000 || Socorro || LINEAR || TEL || align=right | 3.5 km || 
|-id=006 bgcolor=#d6d6d6
| 82006 ||  || — || September 1, 2000 || Socorro || LINEAR || — || align=right | 8.4 km || 
|-id=007 bgcolor=#d6d6d6
| 82007 ||  || — || September 1, 2000 || Socorro || LINEAR || — || align=right | 7.3 km || 
|-id=008 bgcolor=#d6d6d6
| 82008 ||  || — || September 3, 2000 || Kitt Peak || Spacewatch || — || align=right | 6.7 km || 
|-id=009 bgcolor=#d6d6d6
| 82009 ||  || — || September 2, 2000 || Socorro || LINEAR || — || align=right | 11 km || 
|-id=010 bgcolor=#d6d6d6
| 82010 ||  || — || September 2, 2000 || Socorro || LINEAR || HYG || align=right | 6.3 km || 
|-id=011 bgcolor=#d6d6d6
| 82011 ||  || — || September 2, 2000 || Socorro || LINEAR || SHU3:2 || align=right | 12 km || 
|-id=012 bgcolor=#d6d6d6
| 82012 ||  || — || September 2, 2000 || Socorro || LINEAR || — || align=right | 7.3 km || 
|-id=013 bgcolor=#E9E9E9
| 82013 ||  || — || September 2, 2000 || Haleakala || NEAT || TIN || align=right | 2.1 km || 
|-id=014 bgcolor=#d6d6d6
| 82014 ||  || — || September 4, 2000 || Anderson Mesa || LONEOS || — || align=right | 5.1 km || 
|-id=015 bgcolor=#d6d6d6
| 82015 ||  || — || September 4, 2000 || Anderson Mesa || LONEOS || HYG || align=right | 7.6 km || 
|-id=016 bgcolor=#d6d6d6
| 82016 ||  || — || September 5, 2000 || Anderson Mesa || LONEOS || EUP || align=right | 11 km || 
|-id=017 bgcolor=#d6d6d6
| 82017 ||  || — || September 22, 2000 || Socorro || LINEAR || ALA || align=right | 7.3 km || 
|-id=018 bgcolor=#d6d6d6
| 82018 ||  || — || September 21, 2000 || Socorro || LINEAR || EOS || align=right | 3.8 km || 
|-id=019 bgcolor=#d6d6d6
| 82019 ||  || — || September 26, 2000 || Višnjan Observatory || K. Korlević || — || align=right | 8.8 km || 
|-id=020 bgcolor=#fefefe
| 82020 ||  || — || September 23, 2000 || Socorro || LINEAR || H || align=right | 1.4 km || 
|-id=021 bgcolor=#d6d6d6
| 82021 ||  || — || September 23, 2000 || Socorro || LINEAR || TIR || align=right | 6.8 km || 
|-id=022 bgcolor=#d6d6d6
| 82022 ||  || — || September 24, 2000 || Socorro || LINEAR || EOS || align=right | 4.3 km || 
|-id=023 bgcolor=#d6d6d6
| 82023 ||  || — || September 24, 2000 || Socorro || LINEAR || 3:2 || align=right | 11 km || 
|-id=024 bgcolor=#d6d6d6
| 82024 ||  || — || September 22, 2000 || Socorro || LINEAR || 7:4 || align=right | 8.0 km || 
|-id=025 bgcolor=#d6d6d6
| 82025 ||  || — || September 24, 2000 || Socorro || LINEAR || — || align=right | 5.0 km || 
|-id=026 bgcolor=#d6d6d6
| 82026 ||  || — || September 24, 2000 || Socorro || LINEAR || HYG || align=right | 4.8 km || 
|-id=027 bgcolor=#d6d6d6
| 82027 ||  || — || September 24, 2000 || Socorro || LINEAR || 7:4 || align=right | 7.8 km || 
|-id=028 bgcolor=#d6d6d6
| 82028 ||  || — || September 24, 2000 || Socorro || LINEAR || HYG || align=right | 5.9 km || 
|-id=029 bgcolor=#d6d6d6
| 82029 ||  || — || September 23, 2000 || Socorro || LINEAR || — || align=right | 6.5 km || 
|-id=030 bgcolor=#d6d6d6
| 82030 ||  || — || September 23, 2000 || Socorro || LINEAR || URS || align=right | 6.4 km || 
|-id=031 bgcolor=#d6d6d6
| 82031 ||  || — || September 23, 2000 || Socorro || LINEAR || — || align=right | 5.8 km || 
|-id=032 bgcolor=#d6d6d6
| 82032 ||  || — || September 24, 2000 || Socorro || LINEAR || — || align=right | 4.9 km || 
|-id=033 bgcolor=#d6d6d6
| 82033 ||  || — || September 24, 2000 || Socorro || LINEAR || — || align=right | 4.7 km || 
|-id=034 bgcolor=#d6d6d6
| 82034 ||  || — || September 23, 2000 || Socorro || LINEAR || — || align=right | 7.2 km || 
|-id=035 bgcolor=#d6d6d6
| 82035 ||  || — || September 24, 2000 || Socorro || LINEAR || — || align=right | 6.7 km || 
|-id=036 bgcolor=#d6d6d6
| 82036 ||  || — || September 21, 2000 || Haleakala || NEAT || HYG || align=right | 5.5 km || 
|-id=037 bgcolor=#d6d6d6
| 82037 ||  || — || September 20, 2000 || Socorro || LINEAR || — || align=right | 8.6 km || 
|-id=038 bgcolor=#d6d6d6
| 82038 ||  || — || September 20, 2000 || Haleakala || NEAT || EUP || align=right | 6.9 km || 
|-id=039 bgcolor=#d6d6d6
| 82039 ||  || — || September 21, 2000 || Kitt Peak || Spacewatch || — || align=right | 4.9 km || 
|-id=040 bgcolor=#d6d6d6
| 82040 ||  || — || September 23, 2000 || Socorro || LINEAR || URS || align=right | 13 km || 
|-id=041 bgcolor=#d6d6d6
| 82041 ||  || — || September 24, 2000 || Socorro || LINEAR || HIL3:2 || align=right | 11 km || 
|-id=042 bgcolor=#d6d6d6
| 82042 ||  || — || September 24, 2000 || Socorro || LINEAR || 7:4 || align=right | 5.8 km || 
|-id=043 bgcolor=#d6d6d6
| 82043 ||  || — || September 26, 2000 || Socorro || LINEAR || 3:2 || align=right | 12 km || 
|-id=044 bgcolor=#d6d6d6
| 82044 ||  || — || September 26, 2000 || Socorro || LINEAR || 3:2 || align=right | 14 km || 
|-id=045 bgcolor=#fefefe
| 82045 ||  || — || September 25, 2000 || Socorro || LINEAR || H || align=right | 1.1 km || 
|-id=046 bgcolor=#d6d6d6
| 82046 ||  || — || September 24, 2000 || Socorro || LINEAR || HYG || align=right | 5.9 km || 
|-id=047 bgcolor=#d6d6d6
| 82047 ||  || — || September 24, 2000 || Socorro || LINEAR || — || align=right | 4.2 km || 
|-id=048 bgcolor=#d6d6d6
| 82048 ||  || — || September 28, 2000 || Socorro || LINEAR || — || align=right | 8.3 km || 
|-id=049 bgcolor=#d6d6d6
| 82049 ||  || — || September 27, 2000 || Socorro || LINEAR || — || align=right | 7.4 km || 
|-id=050 bgcolor=#d6d6d6
| 82050 ||  || — || September 27, 2000 || Socorro || LINEAR || TIR || align=right | 4.9 km || 
|-id=051 bgcolor=#d6d6d6
| 82051 ||  || — || September 28, 2000 || Socorro || LINEAR || — || align=right | 10 km || 
|-id=052 bgcolor=#d6d6d6
| 82052 ||  || — || September 29, 2000 || Anderson Mesa || LONEOS || — || align=right | 4.0 km || 
|-id=053 bgcolor=#d6d6d6
| 82053 ||  || — || September 23, 2000 || Mauna Kea || B. Gladman, J. J. Kavelaars || — || align=right | 4.5 km || 
|-id=054 bgcolor=#d6d6d6
| 82054 ||  || — || October 1, 2000 || Socorro || LINEAR || ALA || align=right | 8.2 km || 
|-id=055 bgcolor=#C2FFFF
| 82055 ||  || — || October 1, 2000 || Socorro || LINEAR || L5 || align=right | 25 km || 
|-id=056 bgcolor=#d6d6d6
| 82056 ||  || — || October 1, 2000 || Socorro || LINEAR || — || align=right | 4.0 km || 
|-id=057 bgcolor=#d6d6d6
| 82057 ||  || — || October 24, 2000 || Socorro || LINEAR || — || align=right | 9.6 km || 
|-id=058 bgcolor=#d6d6d6
| 82058 ||  || — || October 24, 2000 || Socorro || LINEAR || — || align=right | 12 km || 
|-id=059 bgcolor=#FA8072
| 82059 ||  || — || October 31, 2000 || Socorro || LINEAR || H || align=right | 1.7 km || 
|-id=060 bgcolor=#fefefe
| 82060 ||  || — || November 20, 2000 || Socorro || LINEAR || H || align=right | 1.7 km || 
|-id=061 bgcolor=#fefefe
| 82061 ||  || — || November 21, 2000 || Socorro || LINEAR || H || align=right | 2.2 km || 
|-id=062 bgcolor=#fefefe
| 82062 ||  || — || November 21, 2000 || Socorro || LINEAR || H || align=right | 1.9 km || 
|-id=063 bgcolor=#d6d6d6
| 82063 ||  || — || November 26, 2000 || Socorro || LINEAR || — || align=right | 3.8 km || 
|-id=064 bgcolor=#fefefe
| 82064 ||  || — || November 19, 2000 || Socorro || LINEAR || H || align=right | 1.1 km || 
|-id=065 bgcolor=#fefefe
| 82065 ||  || — || December 5, 2000 || Socorro || LINEAR || H || align=right | 1.9 km || 
|-id=066 bgcolor=#fefefe
| 82066 ||  || — || December 5, 2000 || Socorro || LINEAR || H || align=right | 1.7 km || 
|-id=067 bgcolor=#fefefe
| 82067 ||  || — || December 5, 2000 || Socorro || LINEAR || H || align=right | 1.3 km || 
|-id=068 bgcolor=#fefefe
| 82068 ||  || — || December 15, 2000 || Socorro || LINEAR || H || align=right | 1.2 km || 
|-id=069 bgcolor=#fefefe
| 82069 ||  || — || December 24, 2000 || Haleakala || NEAT || H || align=right | 1.4 km || 
|-id=070 bgcolor=#fefefe
| 82070 ||  || — || December 28, 2000 || Socorro || LINEAR || H || align=right | 1.4 km || 
|-id=071 bgcolor=#fefefe
| 82071 Debrecen ||  ||  || December 31, 2000 || Piszkéstető || K. Sárneczky, L. Kiss || — || align=right | 1.9 km || 
|-id=072 bgcolor=#fefefe
| 82072 ||  || — || December 30, 2000 || Socorro || LINEAR || — || align=right | 2.4 km || 
|-id=073 bgcolor=#fefefe
| 82073 ||  || — || December 30, 2000 || Socorro || LINEAR || FLO || align=right | 1.9 km || 
|-id=074 bgcolor=#fefefe
| 82074 ||  || — || December 31, 2000 || Anderson Mesa || LONEOS || H || align=right | 2.7 km || 
|-id=075 bgcolor=#C2E0FF
| 82075 ||  || — || December 26, 2000 || Kitt Peak || Spacewatch || res3:8moon || align=right | 504 km || 
|-id=076 bgcolor=#fefefe
| 82076 ||  || — || January 4, 2001 || Fair Oaks Ranch || J. V. McClusky || H || align=right | 1.2 km || 
|-id=077 bgcolor=#fefefe
| 82077 ||  || — || January 7, 2001 || Socorro || LINEAR || H || align=right | 2.2 km || 
|-id=078 bgcolor=#fefefe
| 82078 ||  || — || January 15, 2001 || Socorro || LINEAR || H || align=right | 1.9 km || 
|-id=079 bgcolor=#fefefe
| 82079 ||  || — || January 18, 2001 || Socorro || LINEAR || H || align=right | 1.3 km || 
|-id=080 bgcolor=#fefefe
| 82080 ||  || — || January 19, 2001 || Socorro || LINEAR || H || align=right | 1.3 km || 
|-id=081 bgcolor=#fefefe
| 82081 ||  || — || January 21, 2001 || Socorro || LINEAR || H || align=right | 1.2 km || 
|-id=082 bgcolor=#fefefe
| 82082 ||  || — || January 27, 2001 || Haleakala || NEAT || H || align=right | 1.0 km || 
|-id=083 bgcolor=#E9E9E9
| 82083 ||  || — || January 26, 2001 || Socorro || LINEAR || — || align=right | 3.0 km || 
|-id=084 bgcolor=#fefefe
| 82084 ||  || — || January 30, 2001 || Haleakala || NEAT || H || align=right | 1.6 km || 
|-id=085 bgcolor=#FA8072
| 82085 ||  || — || February 3, 2001 || Socorro || LINEAR || H || align=right | 2.2 km || 
|-id=086 bgcolor=#fefefe
| 82086 ||  || — || February 13, 2001 || Socorro || LINEAR || H || align=right | 1.2 km || 
|-id=087 bgcolor=#fefefe
| 82087 ||  || — || February 16, 2001 || Kitt Peak || Spacewatch || — || align=right | 1.1 km || 
|-id=088 bgcolor=#fefefe
| 82088 ||  || — || February 17, 2001 || Haleakala || NEAT || H || align=right data-sort-value="0.97" | 970 m || 
|-id=089 bgcolor=#fefefe
| 82089 ||  || — || February 19, 2001 || Socorro || LINEAR || NYS || align=right | 1.6 km || 
|-id=090 bgcolor=#fefefe
| 82090 ||  || — || February 22, 2001 || Kitt Peak || Spacewatch || MAS || align=right | 1.6 km || 
|-id=091 bgcolor=#fefefe
| 82091 ||  || — || February 26, 2001 || Oizumi || T. Kobayashi || — || align=right | 3.0 km || 
|-id=092 bgcolor=#fefefe
| 82092 Kalocsa ||  ||  || February 27, 2001 || Piszkéstető || K. Sárneczky, A. Derekas || NYS || align=right | 1.2 km || 
|-id=093 bgcolor=#fefefe
| 82093 ||  || — || March 13, 2001 || Socorro || LINEAR || H || align=right | 1.5 km || 
|-id=094 bgcolor=#fefefe
| 82094 ||  || — || March 15, 2001 || Socorro || LINEAR || — || align=right | 2.9 km || 
|-id=095 bgcolor=#fefefe
| 82095 ||  || — || March 15, 2001 || Kitt Peak || Spacewatch || — || align=right | 1.6 km || 
|-id=096 bgcolor=#fefefe
| 82096 ||  || — || March 19, 2001 || Socorro || LINEAR || — || align=right | 1.2 km || 
|-id=097 bgcolor=#fefefe
| 82097 ||  || — || March 19, 2001 || Anderson Mesa || LONEOS || — || align=right | 3.7 km || 
|-id=098 bgcolor=#E9E9E9
| 82098 ||  || — || March 19, 2001 || Anderson Mesa || LONEOS || — || align=right | 2.0 km || 
|-id=099 bgcolor=#fefefe
| 82099 ||  || — || March 19, 2001 || Anderson Mesa || LONEOS || — || align=right | 2.0 km || 
|-id=100 bgcolor=#fefefe
| 82100 ||  || — || March 19, 2001 || Anderson Mesa || LONEOS || — || align=right | 1.3 km || 
|}

82101–82200 

|-bgcolor=#fefefe
| 82101 ||  || — || March 19, 2001 || Anderson Mesa || LONEOS || — || align=right | 1.7 km || 
|-id=102 bgcolor=#fefefe
| 82102 ||  || — || March 21, 2001 || Anderson Mesa || LONEOS || — || align=right | 2.9 km || 
|-id=103 bgcolor=#fefefe
| 82103 ||  || — || March 21, 2001 || Anderson Mesa || LONEOS || — || align=right | 1.9 km || 
|-id=104 bgcolor=#fefefe
| 82104 ||  || — || March 18, 2001 || Socorro || LINEAR || — || align=right | 1.7 km || 
|-id=105 bgcolor=#FA8072
| 82105 ||  || — || March 18, 2001 || Socorro || LINEAR || — || align=right | 2.5 km || 
|-id=106 bgcolor=#fefefe
| 82106 ||  || — || March 18, 2001 || Socorro || LINEAR || FLOfast? || align=right | 1.4 km || 
|-id=107 bgcolor=#fefefe
| 82107 ||  || — || March 18, 2001 || Socorro || LINEAR || — || align=right | 1.5 km || 
|-id=108 bgcolor=#fefefe
| 82108 ||  || — || March 18, 2001 || Socorro || LINEAR || V || align=right | 1.4 km || 
|-id=109 bgcolor=#fefefe
| 82109 ||  || — || March 18, 2001 || Socorro || LINEAR || NYS || align=right | 1.3 km || 
|-id=110 bgcolor=#fefefe
| 82110 ||  || — || March 18, 2001 || Socorro || LINEAR || — || align=right | 2.1 km || 
|-id=111 bgcolor=#fefefe
| 82111 ||  || — || March 18, 2001 || Socorro || LINEAR || — || align=right | 2.4 km || 
|-id=112 bgcolor=#fefefe
| 82112 ||  || — || March 20, 2001 || Socorro || LINEAR || FLO || align=right | 2.5 km || 
|-id=113 bgcolor=#d6d6d6
| 82113 ||  || — || March 19, 2001 || Socorro || LINEAR || — || align=right | 4.3 km || 
|-id=114 bgcolor=#fefefe
| 82114 ||  || — || March 19, 2001 || Socorro || LINEAR || FLO || align=right | 1.4 km || 
|-id=115 bgcolor=#fefefe
| 82115 ||  || — || March 19, 2001 || Socorro || LINEAR || FLO || align=right | 1.3 km || 
|-id=116 bgcolor=#fefefe
| 82116 ||  || — || March 19, 2001 || Socorro || LINEAR || V || align=right | 1.1 km || 
|-id=117 bgcolor=#fefefe
| 82117 ||  || — || March 19, 2001 || Socorro || LINEAR || — || align=right | 1.9 km || 
|-id=118 bgcolor=#fefefe
| 82118 ||  || — || March 19, 2001 || Socorro || LINEAR || — || align=right | 1.4 km || 
|-id=119 bgcolor=#fefefe
| 82119 ||  || — || March 19, 2001 || Socorro || LINEAR || — || align=right | 2.4 km || 
|-id=120 bgcolor=#fefefe
| 82120 ||  || — || March 19, 2001 || Socorro || LINEAR || — || align=right | 1.7 km || 
|-id=121 bgcolor=#fefefe
| 82121 ||  || — || March 19, 2001 || Socorro || LINEAR || — || align=right | 2.4 km || 
|-id=122 bgcolor=#fefefe
| 82122 ||  || — || March 19, 2001 || Socorro || LINEAR || — || align=right | 1.8 km || 
|-id=123 bgcolor=#fefefe
| 82123 ||  || — || March 19, 2001 || Socorro || LINEAR || — || align=right | 2.3 km || 
|-id=124 bgcolor=#FA8072
| 82124 ||  || — || March 19, 2001 || Socorro || LINEAR || — || align=right | 2.1 km || 
|-id=125 bgcolor=#fefefe
| 82125 ||  || — || March 23, 2001 || Socorro || LINEAR || — || align=right | 2.1 km || 
|-id=126 bgcolor=#fefefe
| 82126 ||  || — || March 21, 2001 || Anderson Mesa || LONEOS || — || align=right | 2.3 km || 
|-id=127 bgcolor=#fefefe
| 82127 ||  || — || March 27, 2001 || Kitt Peak || Spacewatch || — || align=right | 1.9 km || 
|-id=128 bgcolor=#fefefe
| 82128 ||  || — || March 26, 2001 || Socorro || LINEAR || — || align=right | 1.7 km || 
|-id=129 bgcolor=#fefefe
| 82129 ||  || — || March 16, 2001 || Socorro || LINEAR || — || align=right | 1.8 km || 
|-id=130 bgcolor=#fefefe
| 82130 ||  || — || March 16, 2001 || Socorro || LINEAR || — || align=right | 1.7 km || 
|-id=131 bgcolor=#fefefe
| 82131 ||  || — || March 18, 2001 || Socorro || LINEAR || V || align=right | 1.6 km || 
|-id=132 bgcolor=#fefefe
| 82132 ||  || — || March 18, 2001 || Socorro || LINEAR || V || align=right | 1.6 km || 
|-id=133 bgcolor=#fefefe
| 82133 ||  || — || March 18, 2001 || Haleakala || NEAT || PHO || align=right | 2.0 km || 
|-id=134 bgcolor=#fefefe
| 82134 ||  || — || March 20, 2001 || Haleakala || NEAT || FLO || align=right | 1.9 km || 
|-id=135 bgcolor=#fefefe
| 82135 ||  || — || March 26, 2001 || Socorro || LINEAR || — || align=right | 1.2 km || 
|-id=136 bgcolor=#fefefe
| 82136 ||  || — || March 26, 2001 || Socorro || LINEAR || — || align=right | 1.7 km || 
|-id=137 bgcolor=#fefefe
| 82137 ||  || — || March 23, 2001 || Anderson Mesa || LONEOS || — || align=right | 1.2 km || 
|-id=138 bgcolor=#fefefe
| 82138 ||  || — || March 23, 2001 || Anderson Mesa || LONEOS || V || align=right | 1.6 km || 
|-id=139 bgcolor=#fefefe
| 82139 ||  || — || March 23, 2001 || Anderson Mesa || LONEOS || — || align=right | 1.9 km || 
|-id=140 bgcolor=#fefefe
| 82140 ||  || — || March 23, 2001 || Anderson Mesa || LONEOS || — || align=right | 2.6 km || 
|-id=141 bgcolor=#fefefe
| 82141 ||  || — || March 29, 2001 || Socorro || LINEAR || — || align=right | 1.4 km || 
|-id=142 bgcolor=#E9E9E9
| 82142 ||  || — || March 20, 2001 || Kitt Peak || Spacewatch || — || align=right | 4.6 km || 
|-id=143 bgcolor=#fefefe
| 82143 ||  || — || March 20, 2001 || Haleakala || NEAT || — || align=right | 1.7 km || 
|-id=144 bgcolor=#fefefe
| 82144 ||  || — || March 21, 2001 || Anderson Mesa || LONEOS || H || align=right | 1.6 km || 
|-id=145 bgcolor=#fefefe
| 82145 ||  || — || March 23, 2001 || Anderson Mesa || LONEOS || NYS || align=right | 1.2 km || 
|-id=146 bgcolor=#fefefe
| 82146 ||  || — || March 24, 2001 || Anderson Mesa || LONEOS || — || align=right | 1.9 km || 
|-id=147 bgcolor=#fefefe
| 82147 ||  || — || March 26, 2001 || Haleakala || NEAT || — || align=right | 1.4 km || 
|-id=148 bgcolor=#fefefe
| 82148 ||  || — || March 29, 2001 || Anderson Mesa || LONEOS || — || align=right | 1.4 km || 
|-id=149 bgcolor=#fefefe
| 82149 ||  || — || March 30, 2001 || Haleakala || NEAT || — || align=right | 1.7 km || 
|-id=150 bgcolor=#fefefe
| 82150 ||  || — || March 30, 2001 || Haleakala || NEAT || — || align=right | 2.2 km || 
|-id=151 bgcolor=#fefefe
| 82151 ||  || — || March 19, 2001 || Anderson Mesa || LONEOS || H || align=right | 1.1 km || 
|-id=152 bgcolor=#fefefe
| 82152 ||  || — || March 23, 2001 || Cima Ekar || ADAS || — || align=right | 1.3 km || 
|-id=153 bgcolor=#E9E9E9
| 82153 Alemigliorini ||  ||  || March 23, 2001 || Cima Ekar || ADAS || — || align=right | 4.3 km || 
|-id=154 bgcolor=#fefefe
| 82154 ||  || — || March 24, 2001 || Socorro || LINEAR || — || align=right | 3.1 km || 
|-id=155 bgcolor=#C2E0FF
| 82155 ||  || — || March 24, 2001 || Kitt Peak || Spacewatch || SDOcritical || align=right | 253 km || 
|-id=156 bgcolor=#fefefe
| 82156 ||  || — || March 31, 2001 || Socorro || LINEAR || — || align=right | 1.7 km || 
|-id=157 bgcolor=#C2E0FF
| 82157 ||  || — || March 26, 2001 || Kitt Peak || M. W. Buie || cubewano (hot)mooncritical || align=right | 172 km || 
|-id=158 bgcolor=#C2E0FF
| 82158 ||  || — || March 26, 2001 || Kitt Peak || M. W. Buie || SDOcritical || align=right | 254 km || 
|-id=159 bgcolor=#fefefe
| 82159 ||  || — || March 27, 2001 || Haleakala || NEAT || FLO || align=right | 2.2 km || 
|-id=160 bgcolor=#fefefe
| 82160 ||  || — || March 24, 2001 || Socorro || LINEAR || FLO || align=right | 1.2 km || 
|-id=161 bgcolor=#fefefe
| 82161 ||  || — || April 14, 2001 || Farra d'Isonzo || Farra d'Isonzo || — || align=right | 1.5 km || 
|-id=162 bgcolor=#fefefe
| 82162 ||  || — || April 14, 2001 || Haleakala || NEAT || — || align=right | 1.9 km || 
|-id=163 bgcolor=#fefefe
| 82163 ||  || — || April 15, 2001 || Haleakala || NEAT || FLO || align=right | 1.5 km || 
|-id=164 bgcolor=#fefefe
| 82164 ||  || — || April 1, 2001 || Anderson Mesa || LONEOS || H || align=right | 1.1 km || 
|-id=165 bgcolor=#fefefe
| 82165 ||  || — || April 17, 2001 || Socorro || LINEAR || FLO || align=right | 3.9 km || 
|-id=166 bgcolor=#fefefe
| 82166 ||  || — || April 17, 2001 || Socorro || LINEAR || V || align=right | 1.5 km || 
|-id=167 bgcolor=#fefefe
| 82167 ||  || — || April 17, 2001 || Socorro || LINEAR || — || align=right | 1.5 km || 
|-id=168 bgcolor=#fefefe
| 82168 ||  || — || April 17, 2001 || Desert Beaver || W. K. Y. Yeung || — || align=right | 1.4 km || 
|-id=169 bgcolor=#fefefe
| 82169 ||  || — || April 18, 2001 || Reedy Creek || J. Broughton || — || align=right | 1.6 km || 
|-id=170 bgcolor=#fefefe
| 82170 ||  || — || April 17, 2001 || Desert Beaver || W. K. Y. Yeung || — || align=right | 1.4 km || 
|-id=171 bgcolor=#fefefe
| 82171 ||  || — || April 16, 2001 || Socorro || LINEAR || ERI || align=right | 4.1 km || 
|-id=172 bgcolor=#fefefe
| 82172 ||  || — || April 16, 2001 || Socorro || LINEAR || — || align=right | 1.6 km || 
|-id=173 bgcolor=#fefefe
| 82173 ||  || — || April 16, 2001 || Socorro || LINEAR || — || align=right | 3.7 km || 
|-id=174 bgcolor=#fefefe
| 82174 ||  || — || April 18, 2001 || Socorro || LINEAR || FLO || align=right data-sort-value="0.97" | 970 m || 
|-id=175 bgcolor=#fefefe
| 82175 ||  || — || April 18, 2001 || Socorro || LINEAR || — || align=right | 1.4 km || 
|-id=176 bgcolor=#fefefe
| 82176 ||  || — || April 18, 2001 || Socorro || LINEAR || — || align=right | 2.2 km || 
|-id=177 bgcolor=#fefefe
| 82177 ||  || — || April 18, 2001 || Socorro || LINEAR || — || align=right | 1.5 km || 
|-id=178 bgcolor=#fefefe
| 82178 ||  || — || April 18, 2001 || Desert Beaver || W. K. Y. Yeung || FLO || align=right | 1.1 km || 
|-id=179 bgcolor=#fefefe
| 82179 ||  || — || April 22, 2001 || Desert Beaver || W. K. Y. Yeung || — || align=right | 1.6 km || 
|-id=180 bgcolor=#fefefe
| 82180 ||  || — || April 23, 2001 || Desert Beaver || W. K. Y. Yeung || FLO || align=right | 1.7 km || 
|-id=181 bgcolor=#fefefe
| 82181 ||  || — || April 24, 2001 || Kitt Peak || Spacewatch || — || align=right | 2.2 km || 
|-id=182 bgcolor=#fefefe
| 82182 ||  || — || April 22, 2001 || Desert Beaver || W. K. Y. Yeung || NYS || align=right | 1.6 km || 
|-id=183 bgcolor=#fefefe
| 82183 ||  || — || April 25, 2001 || Desert Beaver || W. K. Y. Yeung || FLO || align=right | 1.5 km || 
|-id=184 bgcolor=#fefefe
| 82184 ||  || — || April 26, 2001 || Desert Beaver || W. K. Y. Yeung || — || align=right | 2.0 km || 
|-id=185 bgcolor=#fefefe
| 82185 ||  || — || April 27, 2001 || Reedy Creek || J. Broughton || — || align=right | 1.8 km || 
|-id=186 bgcolor=#fefefe
| 82186 ||  || — || April 28, 2001 || Farpoint || G. Hug || — || align=right | 1.2 km || 
|-id=187 bgcolor=#fefefe
| 82187 ||  || — || April 27, 2001 || Socorro || LINEAR || FLO || align=right | 1.5 km || 
|-id=188 bgcolor=#E9E9E9
| 82188 ||  || — || April 27, 2001 || Socorro || LINEAR || — || align=right | 2.1 km || 
|-id=189 bgcolor=#E9E9E9
| 82189 ||  || — || April 27, 2001 || Socorro || LINEAR || — || align=right | 3.1 km || 
|-id=190 bgcolor=#fefefe
| 82190 ||  || — || April 27, 2001 || Socorro || LINEAR || — || align=right | 1.8 km || 
|-id=191 bgcolor=#fefefe
| 82191 ||  || — || April 27, 2001 || Socorro || LINEAR || — || align=right | 1.8 km || 
|-id=192 bgcolor=#E9E9E9
| 82192 ||  || — || April 28, 2001 || Desert Beaver || W. K. Y. Yeung || — || align=right | 2.7 km || 
|-id=193 bgcolor=#fefefe
| 82193 ||  || — || April 27, 2001 || Socorro || LINEAR || — || align=right | 1.5 km || 
|-id=194 bgcolor=#fefefe
| 82194 ||  || — || April 27, 2001 || Socorro || LINEAR || — || align=right | 1.9 km || 
|-id=195 bgcolor=#fefefe
| 82195 ||  || — || April 27, 2001 || Socorro || LINEAR || — || align=right | 2.3 km || 
|-id=196 bgcolor=#fefefe
| 82196 ||  || — || April 27, 2001 || Socorro || LINEAR || NYS || align=right | 1.5 km || 
|-id=197 bgcolor=#E9E9E9
| 82197 ||  || — || April 27, 2001 || Socorro || LINEAR || — || align=right | 8.2 km || 
|-id=198 bgcolor=#fefefe
| 82198 ||  || — || April 29, 2001 || Socorro || LINEAR || FLO || align=right | 3.4 km || 
|-id=199 bgcolor=#fefefe
| 82199 ||  || — || April 29, 2001 || Socorro || LINEAR || FLO || align=right | 1.5 km || 
|-id=200 bgcolor=#fefefe
| 82200 ||  || — || April 29, 2001 || Socorro || LINEAR || FLO || align=right | 1.6 km || 
|}

82201–82300 

|-bgcolor=#fefefe
| 82201 ||  || — || April 29, 2001 || Socorro || LINEAR || — || align=right | 2.0 km || 
|-id=202 bgcolor=#fefefe
| 82202 ||  || — || April 29, 2001 || Socorro || LINEAR || — || align=right | 2.0 km || 
|-id=203 bgcolor=#fefefe
| 82203 ||  || — || April 30, 2001 || Desert Beaver || W. K. Y. Yeung || NYS || align=right | 1.8 km || 
|-id=204 bgcolor=#E9E9E9
| 82204 ||  || — || April 26, 2001 || Kitt Peak || Spacewatch || — || align=right | 2.5 km || 
|-id=205 bgcolor=#fefefe
| 82205 ||  || — || April 26, 2001 || Kitt Peak || Spacewatch || — || align=right | 2.0 km || 
|-id=206 bgcolor=#E9E9E9
| 82206 ||  || — || April 27, 2001 || Socorro || LINEAR || — || align=right | 4.9 km || 
|-id=207 bgcolor=#E9E9E9
| 82207 ||  || — || April 27, 2001 || Socorro || LINEAR || JUN || align=right | 4.4 km || 
|-id=208 bgcolor=#fefefe
| 82208 ||  || — || April 16, 2001 || Socorro || LINEAR || FLO || align=right | 2.8 km || 
|-id=209 bgcolor=#fefefe
| 82209 ||  || — || April 16, 2001 || Anderson Mesa || LONEOS || — || align=right | 1.9 km || 
|-id=210 bgcolor=#fefefe
| 82210 ||  || — || April 16, 2001 || Anderson Mesa || LONEOS || — || align=right | 1.4 km || 
|-id=211 bgcolor=#fefefe
| 82211 ||  || — || April 17, 2001 || Kitt Peak || Spacewatch || FLO || align=right | 1.6 km || 
|-id=212 bgcolor=#fefefe
| 82212 ||  || — || April 18, 2001 || Kitt Peak || Spacewatch || NYS || align=right | 3.4 km || 
|-id=213 bgcolor=#fefefe
| 82213 ||  || — || April 21, 2001 || Socorro || LINEAR || — || align=right | 1.9 km || 
|-id=214 bgcolor=#fefefe
| 82214 ||  || — || April 23, 2001 || Socorro || LINEAR || — || align=right | 1.9 km || 
|-id=215 bgcolor=#fefefe
| 82215 ||  || — || April 23, 2001 || Socorro || LINEAR || FLO || align=right | 1.3 km || 
|-id=216 bgcolor=#fefefe
| 82216 ||  || — || April 23, 2001 || Socorro || LINEAR || FLO || align=right | 1.4 km || 
|-id=217 bgcolor=#fefefe
| 82217 ||  || — || April 23, 2001 || Kitt Peak || Spacewatch || — || align=right | 2.4 km || 
|-id=218 bgcolor=#E9E9E9
| 82218 ||  || — || April 24, 2001 || Anderson Mesa || LONEOS || — || align=right | 3.1 km || 
|-id=219 bgcolor=#E9E9E9
| 82219 ||  || — || April 24, 2001 || Socorro || LINEAR || — || align=right | 6.1 km || 
|-id=220 bgcolor=#fefefe
| 82220 ||  || — || April 24, 2001 || Socorro || LINEAR || FLO || align=right | 1.3 km || 
|-id=221 bgcolor=#fefefe
| 82221 ||  || — || April 24, 2001 || Socorro || LINEAR || V || align=right | 1.6 km || 
|-id=222 bgcolor=#E9E9E9
| 82222 ||  || — || April 24, 2001 || Socorro || LINEAR || — || align=right | 1.8 km || 
|-id=223 bgcolor=#fefefe
| 82223 ||  || — || April 24, 2001 || Haleakala || NEAT || — || align=right | 1.6 km || 
|-id=224 bgcolor=#fefefe
| 82224 ||  || — || April 21, 2001 || Socorro || LINEAR || FLO || align=right | 2.5 km || 
|-id=225 bgcolor=#fefefe
| 82225 ||  || — || April 23, 2001 || Socorro || LINEAR || — || align=right | 2.3 km || 
|-id=226 bgcolor=#fefefe
| 82226 ||  || — || April 24, 2001 || Socorro || LINEAR || — || align=right | 1.9 km || 
|-id=227 bgcolor=#fefefe
| 82227 ||  || — || April 26, 2001 || Anderson Mesa || LONEOS || — || align=right | 1.4 km || 
|-id=228 bgcolor=#fefefe
| 82228 ||  || — || April 27, 2001 || Haleakala || NEAT || — || align=right | 2.8 km || 
|-id=229 bgcolor=#fefefe
| 82229 ||  || — || April 27, 2001 || Haleakala || NEAT || — || align=right | 1.8 km || 
|-id=230 bgcolor=#fefefe
| 82230 ||  || — || April 30, 2001 || Socorro || LINEAR || — || align=right | 1.5 km || 
|-id=231 bgcolor=#fefefe
| 82231 ||  || — || April 16, 2001 || Anderson Mesa || LONEOS || NYS || align=right | 1.3 km || 
|-id=232 bgcolor=#fefefe
| 82232 Heuberger || 2001 JU ||  || May 11, 2001 || Winterthur || M. Griesser || FLO || align=right | 1.3 km || 
|-id=233 bgcolor=#FA8072
| 82233 ||  || — || May 2, 2001 || Kitt Peak || Spacewatch || — || align=right | 1.9 km || 
|-id=234 bgcolor=#fefefe
| 82234 ||  || — || May 11, 2001 || Haleakala || NEAT || NYS || align=right | 1.5 km || 
|-id=235 bgcolor=#fefefe
| 82235 ||  || — || May 15, 2001 || Anderson Mesa || LONEOS || — || align=right | 1.8 km || 
|-id=236 bgcolor=#fefefe
| 82236 ||  || — || May 15, 2001 || Anderson Mesa || LONEOS || — || align=right | 1.7 km || 
|-id=237 bgcolor=#fefefe
| 82237 ||  || — || May 15, 2001 || Haleakala || NEAT || FLO || align=right | 1.3 km || 
|-id=238 bgcolor=#d6d6d6
| 82238 ||  || — || May 15, 2001 || Palomar || NEAT || — || align=right | 4.6 km || 
|-id=239 bgcolor=#fefefe
| 82239 ||  || — || May 15, 2001 || Anderson Mesa || LONEOS || V || align=right | 1.3 km || 
|-id=240 bgcolor=#fefefe
| 82240 ||  || — || May 14, 2001 || Palomar || NEAT || — || align=right | 1.9 km || 
|-id=241 bgcolor=#fefefe
| 82241 ||  || — || May 14, 2001 || Palomar || NEAT || — || align=right | 2.0 km || 
|-id=242 bgcolor=#fefefe
| 82242 ||  || — || May 15, 2001 || Anderson Mesa || LONEOS || FLO || align=right | 1.1 km || 
|-id=243 bgcolor=#fefefe
| 82243 ||  || — || May 15, 2001 || Haleakala || NEAT || V || align=right | 1.7 km || 
|-id=244 bgcolor=#fefefe
| 82244 ||  || — || May 15, 2001 || Haleakala || NEAT || — || align=right | 1.5 km || 
|-id=245 bgcolor=#fefefe
| 82245 ||  || — || May 15, 2001 || Anderson Mesa || LONEOS || — || align=right | 2.0 km || 
|-id=246 bgcolor=#fefefe
| 82246 ||  || — || May 15, 2001 || Anderson Mesa || LONEOS || V || align=right | 1.5 km || 
|-id=247 bgcolor=#fefefe
| 82247 ||  || — || May 15, 2001 || Anderson Mesa || LONEOS || — || align=right | 2.3 km || 
|-id=248 bgcolor=#fefefe
| 82248 ||  || — || May 17, 2001 || Socorro || LINEAR || FLO || align=right | 2.8 km || 
|-id=249 bgcolor=#fefefe
| 82249 ||  || — || May 17, 2001 || Socorro || LINEAR || — || align=right | 2.3 km || 
|-id=250 bgcolor=#fefefe
| 82250 ||  || — || May 21, 2001 || Socorro || LINEAR || — || align=right | 2.8 km || 
|-id=251 bgcolor=#fefefe
| 82251 ||  || — || May 17, 2001 || Socorro || LINEAR || MAS || align=right | 1.2 km || 
|-id=252 bgcolor=#fefefe
| 82252 ||  || — || May 17, 2001 || Socorro || LINEAR || — || align=right | 2.8 km || 
|-id=253 bgcolor=#fefefe
| 82253 ||  || — || May 17, 2001 || Socorro || LINEAR || — || align=right | 1.6 km || 
|-id=254 bgcolor=#fefefe
| 82254 ||  || — || May 18, 2001 || Socorro || LINEAR || V || align=right | 1.4 km || 
|-id=255 bgcolor=#fefefe
| 82255 ||  || — || May 18, 2001 || Socorro || LINEAR || NYS || align=right | 1.4 km || 
|-id=256 bgcolor=#fefefe
| 82256 ||  || — || May 18, 2001 || Socorro || LINEAR || PHO || align=right | 4.1 km || 
|-id=257 bgcolor=#E9E9E9
| 82257 ||  || — || May 18, 2001 || Socorro || LINEAR || — || align=right | 6.8 km || 
|-id=258 bgcolor=#E9E9E9
| 82258 ||  || — || May 18, 2001 || Socorro || LINEAR || — || align=right | 2.2 km || 
|-id=259 bgcolor=#fefefe
| 82259 ||  || — || May 18, 2001 || Socorro || LINEAR || V || align=right | 1.5 km || 
|-id=260 bgcolor=#fefefe
| 82260 ||  || — || May 18, 2001 || Socorro || LINEAR || V || align=right | 1.7 km || 
|-id=261 bgcolor=#fefefe
| 82261 ||  || — || May 18, 2001 || Socorro || LINEAR || — || align=right | 1.6 km || 
|-id=262 bgcolor=#fefefe
| 82262 ||  || — || May 18, 2001 || Socorro || LINEAR || — || align=right | 1.4 km || 
|-id=263 bgcolor=#fefefe
| 82263 ||  || — || May 18, 2001 || Socorro || LINEAR || FLO || align=right | 1.6 km || 
|-id=264 bgcolor=#fefefe
| 82264 ||  || — || May 18, 2001 || Socorro || LINEAR || — || align=right | 1.8 km || 
|-id=265 bgcolor=#fefefe
| 82265 ||  || — || May 18, 2001 || Socorro || LINEAR || — || align=right | 2.7 km || 
|-id=266 bgcolor=#fefefe
| 82266 ||  || — || May 18, 2001 || Socorro || LINEAR || — || align=right | 1.7 km || 
|-id=267 bgcolor=#fefefe
| 82267 ||  || — || May 18, 2001 || Socorro || LINEAR || V || align=right | 1.5 km || 
|-id=268 bgcolor=#fefefe
| 82268 ||  || — || May 18, 2001 || Socorro || LINEAR || FLO || align=right | 1.6 km || 
|-id=269 bgcolor=#fefefe
| 82269 ||  || — || May 18, 2001 || Socorro || LINEAR || V || align=right | 1.4 km || 
|-id=270 bgcolor=#fefefe
| 82270 ||  || — || May 18, 2001 || Socorro || LINEAR || V || align=right | 1.3 km || 
|-id=271 bgcolor=#fefefe
| 82271 ||  || — || May 21, 2001 || Socorro || LINEAR || V || align=right | 1.4 km || 
|-id=272 bgcolor=#fefefe
| 82272 ||  || — || May 21, 2001 || Anderson Mesa || LONEOS || — || align=right | 1.6 km || 
|-id=273 bgcolor=#fefefe
| 82273 ||  || — || May 22, 2001 || Anderson Mesa || LONEOS || — || align=right | 4.5 km || 
|-id=274 bgcolor=#E9E9E9
| 82274 ||  || — || May 17, 2001 || Socorro || LINEAR || — || align=right | 4.6 km || 
|-id=275 bgcolor=#fefefe
| 82275 ||  || — || May 17, 2001 || Socorro || LINEAR || — || align=right | 1.4 km || 
|-id=276 bgcolor=#fefefe
| 82276 ||  || — || May 17, 2001 || Socorro || LINEAR || — || align=right | 3.0 km || 
|-id=277 bgcolor=#fefefe
| 82277 ||  || — || May 17, 2001 || Socorro || LINEAR || — || align=right | 2.1 km || 
|-id=278 bgcolor=#fefefe
| 82278 ||  || — || May 17, 2001 || Socorro || LINEAR || — || align=right | 1.8 km || 
|-id=279 bgcolor=#fefefe
| 82279 ||  || — || May 17, 2001 || Socorro || LINEAR || V || align=right | 1.4 km || 
|-id=280 bgcolor=#fefefe
| 82280 ||  || — || May 17, 2001 || Socorro || LINEAR || NYS || align=right | 1.3 km || 
|-id=281 bgcolor=#fefefe
| 82281 ||  || — || May 17, 2001 || Socorro || LINEAR || V || align=right | 2.4 km || 
|-id=282 bgcolor=#fefefe
| 82282 ||  || — || May 21, 2001 || Socorro || LINEAR || — || align=right | 1.8 km || 
|-id=283 bgcolor=#fefefe
| 82283 ||  || — || May 21, 2001 || Socorro || LINEAR || — || align=right | 1.6 km || 
|-id=284 bgcolor=#fefefe
| 82284 ||  || — || May 21, 2001 || Socorro || LINEAR || — || align=right | 1.7 km || 
|-id=285 bgcolor=#fefefe
| 82285 ||  || — || May 22, 2001 || Socorro || LINEAR || — || align=right | 1.8 km || 
|-id=286 bgcolor=#fefefe
| 82286 ||  || — || May 18, 2001 || Socorro || LINEAR || V || align=right | 1.5 km || 
|-id=287 bgcolor=#E9E9E9
| 82287 ||  || — || May 18, 2001 || Socorro || LINEAR || — || align=right | 5.5 km || 
|-id=288 bgcolor=#E9E9E9
| 82288 ||  || — || May 18, 2001 || Socorro || LINEAR || — || align=right | 3.4 km || 
|-id=289 bgcolor=#fefefe
| 82289 ||  || — || May 18, 2001 || Socorro || LINEAR || — || align=right | 1.7 km || 
|-id=290 bgcolor=#fefefe
| 82290 ||  || — || May 18, 2001 || Socorro || LINEAR || — || align=right | 2.0 km || 
|-id=291 bgcolor=#fefefe
| 82291 ||  || — || May 21, 2001 || Socorro || LINEAR || — || align=right | 1.9 km || 
|-id=292 bgcolor=#fefefe
| 82292 ||  || — || May 21, 2001 || Socorro || LINEAR || NYS || align=right | 1.3 km || 
|-id=293 bgcolor=#fefefe
| 82293 ||  || — || May 22, 2001 || Socorro || LINEAR || — || align=right | 1.6 km || 
|-id=294 bgcolor=#E9E9E9
| 82294 ||  || — || May 22, 2001 || Socorro || LINEAR || — || align=right | 3.3 km || 
|-id=295 bgcolor=#E9E9E9
| 82295 ||  || — || May 22, 2001 || Socorro || LINEAR || — || align=right | 2.4 km || 
|-id=296 bgcolor=#E9E9E9
| 82296 ||  || — || May 22, 2001 || Socorro || LINEAR || — || align=right | 4.6 km || 
|-id=297 bgcolor=#fefefe
| 82297 ||  || — || May 22, 2001 || Socorro || LINEAR || — || align=right | 2.2 km || 
|-id=298 bgcolor=#E9E9E9
| 82298 ||  || — || May 22, 2001 || Socorro || LINEAR || — || align=right | 2.8 km || 
|-id=299 bgcolor=#fefefe
| 82299 ||  || — || May 22, 2001 || Socorro || LINEAR || — || align=right | 1.8 km || 
|-id=300 bgcolor=#fefefe
| 82300 ||  || — || May 22, 2001 || Socorro || LINEAR || ERI || align=right | 3.9 km || 
|}

82301–82400 

|-bgcolor=#fefefe
| 82301 ||  || — || May 22, 2001 || Socorro || LINEAR || — || align=right | 1.7 km || 
|-id=302 bgcolor=#E9E9E9
| 82302 ||  || — || May 22, 2001 || Socorro || LINEAR || RAF || align=right | 2.4 km || 
|-id=303 bgcolor=#fefefe
| 82303 ||  || — || May 22, 2001 || Socorro || LINEAR || V || align=right | 1.7 km || 
|-id=304 bgcolor=#fefefe
| 82304 ||  || — || May 22, 2001 || Socorro || LINEAR || FLO || align=right | 2.1 km || 
|-id=305 bgcolor=#fefefe
| 82305 ||  || — || May 22, 2001 || Socorro || LINEAR || V || align=right | 1.5 km || 
|-id=306 bgcolor=#fefefe
| 82306 ||  || — || May 24, 2001 || Socorro || LINEAR || NYS || align=right | 1.6 km || 
|-id=307 bgcolor=#fefefe
| 82307 ||  || — || May 24, 2001 || Socorro || LINEAR || — || align=right | 1.9 km || 
|-id=308 bgcolor=#fefefe
| 82308 ||  || — || May 24, 2001 || Socorro || LINEAR || V || align=right | 1.3 km || 
|-id=309 bgcolor=#fefefe
| 82309 ||  || — || May 24, 2001 || Socorro || LINEAR || MAS || align=right | 1.7 km || 
|-id=310 bgcolor=#fefefe
| 82310 ||  || — || May 26, 2001 || Socorro || LINEAR || — || align=right | 2.6 km || 
|-id=311 bgcolor=#fefefe
| 82311 ||  || — || May 21, 2001 || Socorro || LINEAR || V || align=right | 1.4 km || 
|-id=312 bgcolor=#fefefe
| 82312 ||  || — || May 22, 2001 || Haleakala || NEAT || FLO || align=right | 2.9 km || 
|-id=313 bgcolor=#fefefe
| 82313 ||  || — || May 22, 2001 || Socorro || LINEAR || — || align=right | 1.5 km || 
|-id=314 bgcolor=#fefefe
| 82314 ||  || — || May 25, 2001 || Socorro || LINEAR || — || align=right | 2.6 km || 
|-id=315 bgcolor=#E9E9E9
| 82315 ||  || — || May 26, 2001 || Socorro || LINEAR || — || align=right | 2.7 km || 
|-id=316 bgcolor=#E9E9E9
| 82316 ||  || — || May 26, 2001 || Socorro || LINEAR || — || align=right | 3.3 km || 
|-id=317 bgcolor=#fefefe
| 82317 ||  || — || May 26, 2001 || Socorro || LINEAR || CHL || align=right | 4.9 km || 
|-id=318 bgcolor=#fefefe
| 82318 ||  || — || May 16, 2001 || Haleakala || NEAT || — || align=right | 3.5 km || 
|-id=319 bgcolor=#fefefe
| 82319 ||  || — || May 17, 2001 || Haleakala || NEAT || — || align=right | 1.7 km || 
|-id=320 bgcolor=#fefefe
| 82320 ||  || — || May 18, 2001 || Socorro || LINEAR || V || align=right | 1.9 km || 
|-id=321 bgcolor=#E9E9E9
| 82321 ||  || — || May 21, 2001 || Kitt Peak || Spacewatch || — || align=right | 1.9 km || 
|-id=322 bgcolor=#fefefe
| 82322 ||  || — || May 26, 2001 || Kitt Peak || Spacewatch || FLO || align=right | 1.8 km || 
|-id=323 bgcolor=#E9E9E9
| 82323 ||  || — || May 26, 2001 || Socorro || LINEAR || — || align=right | 4.7 km || 
|-id=324 bgcolor=#fefefe
| 82324 ||  || — || June 13, 2001 || Socorro || LINEAR || — || align=right | 2.1 km || 
|-id=325 bgcolor=#fefefe
| 82325 ||  || — || June 13, 2001 || Socorro || LINEAR || — || align=right | 2.4 km || 
|-id=326 bgcolor=#E9E9E9
| 82326 ||  || — || June 13, 2001 || Socorro || LINEAR || EUN || align=right | 3.1 km || 
|-id=327 bgcolor=#fefefe
| 82327 ||  || — || June 13, 2001 || Socorro || LINEAR || — || align=right | 2.4 km || 
|-id=328 bgcolor=#E9E9E9
| 82328 ||  || — || June 13, 2001 || Socorro || LINEAR || INO || align=right | 3.2 km || 
|-id=329 bgcolor=#E9E9E9
| 82329 ||  || — || June 13, 2001 || Socorro || LINEAR || — || align=right | 2.7 km || 
|-id=330 bgcolor=#fefefe
| 82330 ||  || — || June 12, 2001 || Haleakala || NEAT || V || align=right | 1.2 km || 
|-id=331 bgcolor=#fefefe
| 82331 ||  || — || June 15, 2001 || Palomar || NEAT || FLO || align=right | 1.7 km || 
|-id=332 bgcolor=#E9E9E9
| 82332 Las Vegas ||  ||  || June 15, 2001 || Palomar || NEAT || HNS || align=right | 2.7 km || 
|-id=333 bgcolor=#E9E9E9
| 82333 ||  || — || June 15, 2001 || Socorro || LINEAR || — || align=right | 7.3 km || 
|-id=334 bgcolor=#fefefe
| 82334 ||  || — || June 15, 2001 || Socorro || LINEAR || V || align=right | 1.7 km || 
|-id=335 bgcolor=#fefefe
| 82335 ||  || — || June 15, 2001 || Socorro || LINEAR || V || align=right | 1.4 km || 
|-id=336 bgcolor=#E9E9E9
| 82336 ||  || — || June 15, 2001 || Socorro || LINEAR || — || align=right | 2.7 km || 
|-id=337 bgcolor=#fefefe
| 82337 ||  || — || June 15, 2001 || Socorro || LINEAR || — || align=right | 2.5 km || 
|-id=338 bgcolor=#E9E9E9
| 82338 ||  || — || June 15, 2001 || Socorro || LINEAR || — || align=right | 2.2 km || 
|-id=339 bgcolor=#E9E9E9
| 82339 ||  || — || June 15, 2001 || Palomar || NEAT || — || align=right | 4.1 km || 
|-id=340 bgcolor=#fefefe
| 82340 ||  || — || June 15, 2001 || Socorro || LINEAR || — || align=right | 4.0 km || 
|-id=341 bgcolor=#fefefe
| 82341 ||  || — || June 12, 2001 || Anderson Mesa || LONEOS || V || align=right | 1.4 km || 
|-id=342 bgcolor=#fefefe
| 82342 ||  || — || June 14, 2001 || Kitt Peak || Spacewatch || — || align=right | 1.9 km || 
|-id=343 bgcolor=#fefefe
| 82343 ||  || — || June 14, 2001 || Kitt Peak || Spacewatch || — || align=right | 1.7 km || 
|-id=344 bgcolor=#E9E9E9
| 82344 ||  || — || June 15, 2001 || Socorro || LINEAR || HNS || align=right | 3.2 km || 
|-id=345 bgcolor=#fefefe
| 82345 ||  || — || June 15, 2001 || Socorro || LINEAR || — || align=right | 1.7 km || 
|-id=346 bgcolor=#fefefe
| 82346 Hakos ||  ||  || June 10, 2001 || Hakos || D. Husar || FLO || align=right | 1.6 km || 
|-id=347 bgcolor=#fefefe
| 82347 ||  || — || June 15, 2001 || Socorro || LINEAR || — || align=right | 2.2 km || 
|-id=348 bgcolor=#E9E9E9
| 82348 ||  || — || June 15, 2001 || Socorro || LINEAR || ADE || align=right | 6.7 km || 
|-id=349 bgcolor=#fefefe
| 82349 ||  || — || June 15, 2001 || Socorro || LINEAR || — || align=right | 3.0 km || 
|-id=350 bgcolor=#d6d6d6
| 82350 ||  || — || June 15, 2001 || Socorro || LINEAR || — || align=right | 5.2 km || 
|-id=351 bgcolor=#E9E9E9
| 82351 ||  || — || June 18, 2001 || Palomar || NEAT || — || align=right | 2.9 km || 
|-id=352 bgcolor=#d6d6d6
| 82352 ||  || — || June 18, 2001 || Palomar || NEAT || URS || align=right | 12 km || 
|-id=353 bgcolor=#fefefe
| 82353 ||  || — || June 18, 2001 || Palomar || NEAT || — || align=right | 1.9 km || 
|-id=354 bgcolor=#fefefe
| 82354 ||  || — || June 19, 2001 || Socorro || LINEAR || PHO || align=right | 3.3 km || 
|-id=355 bgcolor=#fefefe
| 82355 ||  || — || June 16, 2001 || Palomar || NEAT || — || align=right | 2.0 km || 
|-id=356 bgcolor=#d6d6d6
| 82356 ||  || — || June 16, 2001 || Palomar || NEAT || — || align=right | 13 km || 
|-id=357 bgcolor=#fefefe
| 82357 ||  || — || June 16, 2001 || Socorro || LINEAR || V || align=right | 1.4 km || 
|-id=358 bgcolor=#fefefe
| 82358 ||  || — || June 18, 2001 || Palomar || NEAT || — || align=right | 2.4 km || 
|-id=359 bgcolor=#E9E9E9
| 82359 ||  || — || June 21, 2001 || Palomar || NEAT || — || align=right | 4.6 km || 
|-id=360 bgcolor=#E9E9E9
| 82360 ||  || — || June 21, 2001 || Palomar || NEAT || — || align=right | 5.9 km || 
|-id=361 bgcolor=#E9E9E9
| 82361 Benitoloyola ||  ||  || June 23, 2001 || Badlands || R. Dyvig || — || align=right | 5.2 km || 
|-id=362 bgcolor=#E9E9E9
| 82362 ||  || — || June 17, 2001 || Kitt Peak || Spacewatch || — || align=right | 4.9 km || 
|-id=363 bgcolor=#E9E9E9
| 82363 ||  || — || June 21, 2001 || Socorro || LINEAR || — || align=right | 5.5 km || 
|-id=364 bgcolor=#fefefe
| 82364 ||  || — || June 20, 2001 || Reedy Creek || J. Broughton || fast? || align=right | 2.1 km || 
|-id=365 bgcolor=#d6d6d6
| 82365 ||  || — || June 25, 2001 || Ondřejov || P. Kušnirák || — || align=right | 5.8 km || 
|-id=366 bgcolor=#E9E9E9
| 82366 ||  || — || June 16, 2001 || Haleakala || NEAT || — || align=right | 3.1 km || 
|-id=367 bgcolor=#d6d6d6
| 82367 ||  || — || June 21, 2001 || Palomar || NEAT || — || align=right | 7.3 km || 
|-id=368 bgcolor=#fefefe
| 82368 ||  || — || June 21, 2001 || Palomar || NEAT || NYS || align=right | 2.6 km || 
|-id=369 bgcolor=#E9E9E9
| 82369 ||  || — || June 21, 2001 || Palomar || NEAT || DOR || align=right | 4.9 km || 
|-id=370 bgcolor=#fefefe
| 82370 ||  || — || June 26, 2001 || Reedy Creek || J. Broughton || — || align=right | 1.3 km || 
|-id=371 bgcolor=#E9E9E9
| 82371 ||  || — || June 28, 2001 || Anderson Mesa || LONEOS || EUN || align=right | 5.0 km || 
|-id=372 bgcolor=#E9E9E9
| 82372 ||  || — || June 19, 2001 || Palomar || NEAT || — || align=right | 2.0 km || 
|-id=373 bgcolor=#E9E9E9
| 82373 ||  || — || June 21, 2001 || Palomar || NEAT || CLO || align=right | 5.7 km || 
|-id=374 bgcolor=#fefefe
| 82374 ||  || — || June 25, 2001 || Palomar || NEAT || FLO || align=right | 1.6 km || 
|-id=375 bgcolor=#d6d6d6
| 82375 ||  || — || June 25, 2001 || Palomar || NEAT || — || align=right | 7.3 km || 
|-id=376 bgcolor=#fefefe
| 82376 ||  || — || June 27, 2001 || Palomar || NEAT || — || align=right | 1.9 km || 
|-id=377 bgcolor=#E9E9E9
| 82377 ||  || — || June 27, 2001 || Palomar || NEAT || WIT || align=right | 2.1 km || 
|-id=378 bgcolor=#E9E9E9
| 82378 ||  || — || June 27, 2001 || Palomar || NEAT || HOF || align=right | 5.7 km || 
|-id=379 bgcolor=#E9E9E9
| 82379 ||  || — || June 27, 2001 || Palomar || NEAT || WIT || align=right | 2.1 km || 
|-id=380 bgcolor=#d6d6d6
| 82380 ||  || — || June 28, 2001 || Anderson Mesa || LONEOS || — || align=right | 12 km || 
|-id=381 bgcolor=#E9E9E9
| 82381 ||  || — || June 23, 2001 || Palomar || NEAT || WIT || align=right | 2.5 km || 
|-id=382 bgcolor=#E9E9E9
| 82382 ||  || — || June 29, 2001 || Anderson Mesa || LONEOS || MAR || align=right | 2.8 km || 
|-id=383 bgcolor=#E9E9E9
| 82383 ||  || — || June 29, 2001 || Anderson Mesa || LONEOS || EUN || align=right | 3.0 km || 
|-id=384 bgcolor=#d6d6d6
| 82384 ||  || — || June 25, 2001 || Palomar || NEAT || — || align=right | 6.1 km || 
|-id=385 bgcolor=#E9E9E9
| 82385 ||  || — || June 28, 2001 || Palomar || NEAT || — || align=right | 2.5 km || 
|-id=386 bgcolor=#E9E9E9
| 82386 ||  || — || June 23, 2001 || Palomar || NEAT || — || align=right | 2.2 km || 
|-id=387 bgcolor=#E9E9E9
| 82387 ||  || — || June 16, 2001 || Anderson Mesa || LONEOS || — || align=right | 2.8 km || 
|-id=388 bgcolor=#E9E9E9
| 82388 ||  || — || June 16, 2001 || Anderson Mesa || LONEOS || — || align=right | 2.7 km || 
|-id=389 bgcolor=#fefefe
| 82389 ||  || — || June 17, 2001 || Anderson Mesa || LONEOS || NYS || align=right | 1.6 km || 
|-id=390 bgcolor=#fefefe
| 82390 ||  || — || June 19, 2001 || Haleakala || NEAT || NYS || align=right | 4.9 km || 
|-id=391 bgcolor=#fefefe
| 82391 ||  || — || June 19, 2001 || Haleakala || NEAT || — || align=right | 2.6 km || 
|-id=392 bgcolor=#fefefe
| 82392 ||  || — || June 26, 2001 || Palomar || NEAT || — || align=right | 1.9 km || 
|-id=393 bgcolor=#fefefe
| 82393 ||  || — || June 27, 2001 || Anderson Mesa || LONEOS || V || align=right | 1.6 km || 
|-id=394 bgcolor=#E9E9E9
| 82394 ||  || — || June 27, 2001 || Anderson Mesa || LONEOS || — || align=right | 2.6 km || 
|-id=395 bgcolor=#E9E9E9
| 82395 ||  || — || July 12, 2001 || Palomar || NEAT || — || align=right | 4.8 km || 
|-id=396 bgcolor=#E9E9E9
| 82396 ||  || — || July 10, 2001 || Palomar || NEAT || — || align=right | 4.3 km || 
|-id=397 bgcolor=#E9E9E9
| 82397 ||  || — || July 13, 2001 || Palomar || NEAT || — || align=right | 2.4 km || 
|-id=398 bgcolor=#d6d6d6
| 82398 ||  || — || July 13, 2001 || Palomar || NEAT || — || align=right | 5.4 km || 
|-id=399 bgcolor=#d6d6d6
| 82399 ||  || — || July 13, 2001 || Palomar || NEAT || KOR || align=right | 2.6 km || 
|-id=400 bgcolor=#E9E9E9
| 82400 ||  || — || July 13, 2001 || Haleakala || NEAT || — || align=right | 3.0 km || 
|}

82401–82500 

|-bgcolor=#E9E9E9
| 82401 ||  || — || July 13, 2001 || Haleakala || NEAT || — || align=right | 4.2 km || 
|-id=402 bgcolor=#E9E9E9
| 82402 ||  || — || July 14, 2001 || Palomar || NEAT || — || align=right | 2.9 km || 
|-id=403 bgcolor=#d6d6d6
| 82403 ||  || — || July 13, 2001 || Palomar || NEAT || — || align=right | 5.4 km || 
|-id=404 bgcolor=#E9E9E9
| 82404 ||  || — || July 14, 2001 || Palomar || NEAT || — || align=right | 2.8 km || 
|-id=405 bgcolor=#d6d6d6
| 82405 ||  || — || July 14, 2001 || Palomar || NEAT || — || align=right | 6.2 km || 
|-id=406 bgcolor=#d6d6d6
| 82406 ||  || — || July 13, 2001 || Palomar || NEAT || VER || align=right | 7.4 km || 
|-id=407 bgcolor=#fefefe
| 82407 ||  || — || July 14, 2001 || Haleakala || NEAT || MAS || align=right | 1.2 km || 
|-id=408 bgcolor=#d6d6d6
| 82408 ||  || — || July 14, 2001 || Haleakala || NEAT || — || align=right | 9.1 km || 
|-id=409 bgcolor=#fefefe
| 82409 ||  || — || July 14, 2001 || Haleakala || NEAT || FLO || align=right | 1.4 km || 
|-id=410 bgcolor=#E9E9E9
| 82410 ||  || — || July 12, 2001 || Palomar || NEAT || — || align=right | 2.0 km || 
|-id=411 bgcolor=#fefefe
| 82411 ||  || — || July 13, 2001 || Haleakala || NEAT || — || align=right | 2.3 km || 
|-id=412 bgcolor=#E9E9E9
| 82412 ||  || — || July 14, 2001 || Haleakala || NEAT || — || align=right | 2.8 km || 
|-id=413 bgcolor=#E9E9E9
| 82413 ||  || — || July 13, 2001 || Palomar || NEAT || EUN || align=right | 2.4 km || 
|-id=414 bgcolor=#d6d6d6
| 82414 ||  || — || July 14, 2001 || Palomar || NEAT || — || align=right | 6.2 km || 
|-id=415 bgcolor=#E9E9E9
| 82415 ||  || — || July 14, 2001 || Haleakala || NEAT || — || align=right | 3.0 km || 
|-id=416 bgcolor=#fefefe
| 82416 ||  || — || July 14, 2001 || Palomar || NEAT || — || align=right | 3.2 km || 
|-id=417 bgcolor=#E9E9E9
| 82417 ||  || — || July 14, 2001 || Palomar || NEAT || WIT || align=right | 2.4 km || 
|-id=418 bgcolor=#E9E9E9
| 82418 ||  || — || July 14, 2001 || Palomar || NEAT || — || align=right | 1.9 km || 
|-id=419 bgcolor=#E9E9E9
| 82419 ||  || — || July 14, 2001 || Palomar || NEAT || — || align=right | 5.3 km || 
|-id=420 bgcolor=#fefefe
| 82420 ||  || — || July 14, 2001 || Palomar || NEAT || FLO || align=right | 2.4 km || 
|-id=421 bgcolor=#E9E9E9
| 82421 ||  || — || July 9, 2001 || Palomar || NEAT || — || align=right | 2.7 km || 
|-id=422 bgcolor=#fefefe
| 82422 ||  || — || July 12, 2001 || Palomar || NEAT || PHO || align=right | 2.2 km || 
|-id=423 bgcolor=#E9E9E9
| 82423 ||  || — || July 13, 2001 || Palomar || NEAT || EUN || align=right | 3.1 km || 
|-id=424 bgcolor=#E9E9E9
| 82424 ||  || — || July 14, 2001 || Palomar || NEAT || HNS || align=right | 2.8 km || 
|-id=425 bgcolor=#fefefe
| 82425 ||  || — || July 15, 2001 || Haleakala || NEAT || — || align=right | 3.0 km || 
|-id=426 bgcolor=#E9E9E9
| 82426 ||  || — || July 12, 2001 || Palomar || NEAT || HNS || align=right | 2.8 km || 
|-id=427 bgcolor=#d6d6d6
| 82427 ||  || — || July 14, 2001 || Palomar || NEAT || — || align=right | 8.1 km || 
|-id=428 bgcolor=#fefefe
| 82428 ||  || — || July 14, 2001 || Palomar || NEAT || NYS || align=right | 1.6 km || 
|-id=429 bgcolor=#E9E9E9
| 82429 ||  || — || July 14, 2001 || Palomar || NEAT || — || align=right | 2.4 km || 
|-id=430 bgcolor=#fefefe
| 82430 ||  || — || July 14, 2001 || Haleakala || NEAT || FLO || align=right | 1.3 km || 
|-id=431 bgcolor=#E9E9E9
| 82431 || 2001 OF || — || July 16, 2001 || Anderson Mesa || LONEOS || — || align=right | 2.8 km || 
|-id=432 bgcolor=#fefefe
| 82432 ||  || — || July 18, 2001 || Palomar || NEAT || FLO || align=right | 1.4 km || 
|-id=433 bgcolor=#d6d6d6
| 82433 ||  || — || July 18, 2001 || Palomar || NEAT || — || align=right | 6.5 km || 
|-id=434 bgcolor=#E9E9E9
| 82434 ||  || — || July 17, 2001 || Anderson Mesa || LONEOS || — || align=right | 3.2 km || 
|-id=435 bgcolor=#d6d6d6
| 82435 ||  || — || July 18, 2001 || Palomar || NEAT || — || align=right | 8.4 km || 
|-id=436 bgcolor=#E9E9E9
| 82436 ||  || — || July 17, 2001 || Anderson Mesa || LONEOS || — || align=right | 3.2 km || 
|-id=437 bgcolor=#d6d6d6
| 82437 ||  || — || July 17, 2001 || Anderson Mesa || LONEOS || — || align=right | 7.7 km || 
|-id=438 bgcolor=#E9E9E9
| 82438 ||  || — || July 17, 2001 || Anderson Mesa || LONEOS || KON || align=right | 5.0 km || 
|-id=439 bgcolor=#d6d6d6
| 82439 ||  || — || July 17, 2001 || Anderson Mesa || LONEOS || — || align=right | 9.0 km || 
|-id=440 bgcolor=#d6d6d6
| 82440 ||  || — || July 17, 2001 || Anderson Mesa || LONEOS || URS || align=right | 7.6 km || 
|-id=441 bgcolor=#fefefe
| 82441 ||  || — || July 17, 2001 || Anderson Mesa || LONEOS || V || align=right | 1.7 km || 
|-id=442 bgcolor=#fefefe
| 82442 ||  || — || July 17, 2001 || Anderson Mesa || LONEOS || — || align=right | 1.8 km || 
|-id=443 bgcolor=#fefefe
| 82443 ||  || — || July 17, 2001 || Anderson Mesa || LONEOS || — || align=right | 2.7 km || 
|-id=444 bgcolor=#E9E9E9
| 82444 ||  || — || July 20, 2001 || Anderson Mesa || LONEOS || — || align=right | 2.4 km || 
|-id=445 bgcolor=#d6d6d6
| 82445 ||  || — || July 20, 2001 || Anderson Mesa || LONEOS || — || align=right | 5.1 km || 
|-id=446 bgcolor=#E9E9E9
| 82446 ||  || — || July 20, 2001 || Anderson Mesa || LONEOS || — || align=right | 7.0 km || 
|-id=447 bgcolor=#E9E9E9
| 82447 ||  || — || July 20, 2001 || Anderson Mesa || LONEOS || ADE || align=right | 6.5 km || 
|-id=448 bgcolor=#fefefe
| 82448 ||  || — || July 20, 2001 || Reedy Creek || J. Broughton || MAS || align=right | 1.5 km || 
|-id=449 bgcolor=#fefefe
| 82449 ||  || — || July 20, 2001 || Reedy Creek || J. Broughton || — || align=right | 2.9 km || 
|-id=450 bgcolor=#E9E9E9
| 82450 ||  || — || July 19, 2001 || Palomar || NEAT || — || align=right | 2.4 km || 
|-id=451 bgcolor=#fefefe
| 82451 ||  || — || July 19, 2001 || Palomar || NEAT || FLO || align=right | 1.4 km || 
|-id=452 bgcolor=#fefefe
| 82452 ||  || — || July 20, 2001 || Palomar || NEAT || — || align=right | 1.8 km || 
|-id=453 bgcolor=#E9E9E9
| 82453 ||  || — || July 20, 2001 || Palomar || NEAT || — || align=right | 4.9 km || 
|-id=454 bgcolor=#d6d6d6
| 82454 ||  || — || July 21, 2001 || San Marcello || A. Boattini, L. Tesi || — || align=right | 7.2 km || 
|-id=455 bgcolor=#fefefe
| 82455 ||  || — || July 20, 2001 || Socorro || LINEAR || — || align=right | 2.6 km || 
|-id=456 bgcolor=#d6d6d6
| 82456 ||  || — || July 20, 2001 || Socorro || LINEAR || AEG || align=right | 10 km || 
|-id=457 bgcolor=#d6d6d6
| 82457 ||  || — || July 20, 2001 || Socorro || LINEAR || — || align=right | 5.7 km || 
|-id=458 bgcolor=#fefefe
| 82458 ||  || — || July 20, 2001 || Socorro || LINEAR || — || align=right | 2.3 km || 
|-id=459 bgcolor=#E9E9E9
| 82459 ||  || — || July 18, 2001 || Palomar || NEAT || EUN || align=right | 2.7 km || 
|-id=460 bgcolor=#E9E9E9
| 82460 ||  || — || July 19, 2001 || Haleakala || NEAT || — || align=right | 2.7 km || 
|-id=461 bgcolor=#fefefe
| 82461 ||  || — || July 19, 2001 || Haleakala || NEAT || NYS || align=right | 1.7 km || 
|-id=462 bgcolor=#E9E9E9
| 82462 ||  || — || July 21, 2001 || Palomar || NEAT || — || align=right | 5.8 km || 
|-id=463 bgcolor=#d6d6d6
| 82463 Mluigiaborsi ||  ||  || July 21, 2001 || San Marcello || L. Tesi, G. Forti || HYG || align=right | 8.5 km || 
|-id=464 bgcolor=#d6d6d6
| 82464 Jaroslavboček ||  ||  || July 21, 2001 || Ondřejov || P. Pravec, L. Kotková || — || align=right | 4.6 km || 
|-id=465 bgcolor=#fefefe
| 82465 ||  || — || July 17, 2001 || Haleakala || NEAT || NYS || align=right | 3.5 km || 
|-id=466 bgcolor=#fefefe
| 82466 ||  || — || July 17, 2001 || Haleakala || NEAT || V || align=right | 2.0 km || 
|-id=467 bgcolor=#fefefe
| 82467 ||  || — || July 18, 2001 || Haleakala || NEAT || V || align=right | 1.5 km || 
|-id=468 bgcolor=#d6d6d6
| 82468 ||  || — || July 21, 2001 || Anderson Mesa || LONEOS || EUP || align=right | 7.7 km || 
|-id=469 bgcolor=#d6d6d6
| 82469 ||  || — || July 21, 2001 || Anderson Mesa || LONEOS || TIR || align=right | 5.7 km || 
|-id=470 bgcolor=#E9E9E9
| 82470 ||  || — || July 21, 2001 || Anderson Mesa || LONEOS || NEM || align=right | 3.0 km || 
|-id=471 bgcolor=#E9E9E9
| 82471 ||  || — || July 21, 2001 || Anderson Mesa || LONEOS || — || align=right | 3.9 km || 
|-id=472 bgcolor=#E9E9E9
| 82472 ||  || — || July 19, 2001 || OCA-Anza || M. White, M. Collins || — || align=right | 2.7 km || 
|-id=473 bgcolor=#E9E9E9
| 82473 ||  || — || July 17, 2001 || Palomar || NEAT || — || align=right | 2.5 km || 
|-id=474 bgcolor=#FA8072
| 82474 ||  || — || July 21, 2001 || Palomar || NEAT || — || align=right | 2.2 km || 
|-id=475 bgcolor=#E9E9E9
| 82475 ||  || — || July 22, 2001 || Palomar || NEAT || — || align=right | 4.1 km || 
|-id=476 bgcolor=#fefefe
| 82476 ||  || — || July 16, 2001 || Anderson Mesa || LONEOS || NYS || align=right | 1.3 km || 
|-id=477 bgcolor=#E9E9E9
| 82477 ||  || — || July 16, 2001 || Anderson Mesa || LONEOS || NEM || align=right | 4.3 km || 
|-id=478 bgcolor=#d6d6d6
| 82478 ||  || — || July 18, 2001 || Haleakala || NEAT || — || align=right | 7.7 km || 
|-id=479 bgcolor=#fefefe
| 82479 ||  || — || July 18, 2001 || Haleakala || NEAT || — || align=right | 1.6 km || 
|-id=480 bgcolor=#E9E9E9
| 82480 ||  || — || July 19, 2001 || Palomar || NEAT || MAR || align=right | 2.3 km || 
|-id=481 bgcolor=#E9E9E9
| 82481 ||  || — || July 19, 2001 || Palomar || NEAT || — || align=right | 2.4 km || 
|-id=482 bgcolor=#fefefe
| 82482 ||  || — || July 19, 2001 || Palomar || NEAT || — || align=right | 1.9 km || 
|-id=483 bgcolor=#fefefe
| 82483 ||  || — || July 19, 2001 || Palomar || NEAT || — || align=right | 2.5 km || 
|-id=484 bgcolor=#E9E9E9
| 82484 ||  || — || July 21, 2001 || Kitt Peak || Spacewatch || — || align=right | 5.4 km || 
|-id=485 bgcolor=#E9E9E9
| 82485 ||  || — || July 21, 2001 || Kitt Peak || Spacewatch || HOF || align=right | 6.1 km || 
|-id=486 bgcolor=#E9E9E9
| 82486 ||  || — || July 20, 2001 || Palomar || NEAT || — || align=right | 2.3 km || 
|-id=487 bgcolor=#E9E9E9
| 82487 ||  || — || July 20, 2001 || Palomar || NEAT || — || align=right | 2.8 km || 
|-id=488 bgcolor=#fefefe
| 82488 ||  || — || July 20, 2001 || Palomar || NEAT || — || align=right | 2.0 km || 
|-id=489 bgcolor=#d6d6d6
| 82489 ||  || — || July 20, 2001 || Palomar || NEAT || — || align=right | 5.4 km || 
|-id=490 bgcolor=#d6d6d6
| 82490 ||  || — || July 20, 2001 || Palomar || NEAT || — || align=right | 6.9 km || 
|-id=491 bgcolor=#E9E9E9
| 82491 ||  || — || July 20, 2001 || Palomar || NEAT || — || align=right | 1.9 km || 
|-id=492 bgcolor=#E9E9E9
| 82492 ||  || — || July 20, 2001 || Palomar || NEAT || — || align=right | 2.6 km || 
|-id=493 bgcolor=#E9E9E9
| 82493 ||  || — || July 20, 2001 || Palomar || NEAT || — || align=right | 4.8 km || 
|-id=494 bgcolor=#fefefe
| 82494 ||  || — || July 20, 2001 || Palomar || NEAT || — || align=right | 2.7 km || 
|-id=495 bgcolor=#E9E9E9
| 82495 ||  || — || July 21, 2001 || Palomar || NEAT || PAD || align=right | 2.8 km || 
|-id=496 bgcolor=#d6d6d6
| 82496 ||  || — || July 22, 2001 || Palomar || NEAT || 7:4 || align=right | 8.4 km || 
|-id=497 bgcolor=#E9E9E9
| 82497 ||  || — || July 22, 2001 || Palomar || NEAT || — || align=right | 4.5 km || 
|-id=498 bgcolor=#E9E9E9
| 82498 ||  || — || July 23, 2001 || Palomar || NEAT || — || align=right | 5.9 km || 
|-id=499 bgcolor=#d6d6d6
| 82499 ||  || — || July 23, 2001 || Palomar || NEAT || — || align=right | 7.7 km || 
|-id=500 bgcolor=#E9E9E9
| 82500 ||  || — || July 16, 2001 || Anderson Mesa || LONEOS || — || align=right | 2.8 km || 
|}

82501–82600 

|-bgcolor=#fefefe
| 82501 ||  || — || July 16, 2001 || Anderson Mesa || LONEOS || — || align=right | 2.0 km || 
|-id=502 bgcolor=#E9E9E9
| 82502 ||  || — || July 16, 2001 || Anderson Mesa || LONEOS || — || align=right | 3.1 km || 
|-id=503 bgcolor=#E9E9E9
| 82503 ||  || — || July 16, 2001 || Anderson Mesa || LONEOS || — || align=right | 2.2 km || 
|-id=504 bgcolor=#fefefe
| 82504 ||  || — || July 16, 2001 || Anderson Mesa || LONEOS || — || align=right | 1.8 km || 
|-id=505 bgcolor=#fefefe
| 82505 ||  || — || July 16, 2001 || Anderson Mesa || LONEOS || — || align=right | 2.8 km || 
|-id=506 bgcolor=#d6d6d6
| 82506 ||  || — || July 16, 2001 || Haleakala || NEAT || EOS || align=right | 4.8 km || 
|-id=507 bgcolor=#E9E9E9
| 82507 ||  || — || July 16, 2001 || Haleakala || NEAT || — || align=right | 4.4 km || 
|-id=508 bgcolor=#fefefe
| 82508 ||  || — || July 17, 2001 || Anderson Mesa || LONEOS || — || align=right | 2.0 km || 
|-id=509 bgcolor=#fefefe
| 82509 ||  || — || July 17, 2001 || Anderson Mesa || LONEOS || — || align=right | 2.0 km || 
|-id=510 bgcolor=#E9E9E9
| 82510 ||  || — || July 17, 2001 || Palomar || NEAT || — || align=right | 4.5 km || 
|-id=511 bgcolor=#fefefe
| 82511 ||  || — || July 17, 2001 || Palomar || NEAT || NYS || align=right | 1.5 km || 
|-id=512 bgcolor=#E9E9E9
| 82512 ||  || — || July 17, 2001 || Palomar || NEAT || AGN || align=right | 2.7 km || 
|-id=513 bgcolor=#fefefe
| 82513 ||  || — || July 17, 2001 || Haleakala || NEAT || V || align=right | 1.8 km || 
|-id=514 bgcolor=#d6d6d6
| 82514 ||  || — || July 19, 2001 || Haleakala || NEAT || — || align=right | 6.8 km || 
|-id=515 bgcolor=#fefefe
| 82515 ||  || — || July 19, 2001 || Haleakala || NEAT || V || align=right | 1.6 km || 
|-id=516 bgcolor=#d6d6d6
| 82516 ||  || — || July 21, 2001 || Palomar || NEAT || — || align=right | 7.2 km || 
|-id=517 bgcolor=#E9E9E9
| 82517 ||  || — || July 21, 2001 || Palomar || NEAT || — || align=right | 5.2 km || 
|-id=518 bgcolor=#E9E9E9
| 82518 ||  || — || July 21, 2001 || Palomar || NEAT || MAR || align=right | 2.3 km || 
|-id=519 bgcolor=#E9E9E9
| 82519 ||  || — || July 21, 2001 || Palomar || NEAT || — || align=right | 4.0 km || 
|-id=520 bgcolor=#E9E9E9
| 82520 ||  || — || July 21, 2001 || Palomar || NEAT || EUN || align=right | 3.4 km || 
|-id=521 bgcolor=#E9E9E9
| 82521 ||  || — || July 21, 2001 || Palomar || NEAT || — || align=right | 3.3 km || 
|-id=522 bgcolor=#d6d6d6
| 82522 ||  || — || July 21, 2001 || Palomar || NEAT || — || align=right | 5.3 km || 
|-id=523 bgcolor=#E9E9E9
| 82523 ||  || — || July 22, 2001 || Palomar || NEAT || — || align=right | 4.1 km || 
|-id=524 bgcolor=#E9E9E9
| 82524 ||  || — || July 22, 2001 || Palomar || NEAT || — || align=right | 2.8 km || 
|-id=525 bgcolor=#d6d6d6
| 82525 ||  || — || July 22, 2001 || Palomar || NEAT || URS || align=right | 9.2 km || 
|-id=526 bgcolor=#d6d6d6
| 82526 ||  || — || July 22, 2001 || Palomar || NEAT || NAE || align=right | 6.7 km || 
|-id=527 bgcolor=#fefefe
| 82527 ||  || — || July 16, 2001 || Anderson Mesa || LONEOS || MAS || align=right | 1.3 km || 
|-id=528 bgcolor=#E9E9E9
| 82528 ||  || — || July 19, 2001 || Palomar || NEAT || — || align=right | 4.3 km || 
|-id=529 bgcolor=#E9E9E9
| 82529 ||  || — || July 20, 2001 || Anderson Mesa || LONEOS || — || align=right | 3.0 km || 
|-id=530 bgcolor=#E9E9E9
| 82530 ||  || — || July 21, 2001 || Haleakala || NEAT || — || align=right | 2.5 km || 
|-id=531 bgcolor=#fefefe
| 82531 ||  || — || July 21, 2001 || Haleakala || NEAT || — || align=right | 2.3 km || 
|-id=532 bgcolor=#E9E9E9
| 82532 ||  || — || July 19, 2001 || Haleakala || NEAT || — || align=right | 1.9 km || 
|-id=533 bgcolor=#fefefe
| 82533 ||  || — || July 23, 2001 || Haleakala || NEAT || — || align=right | 2.2 km || 
|-id=534 bgcolor=#d6d6d6
| 82534 ||  || — || July 23, 2001 || Haleakala || NEAT || — || align=right | 4.2 km || 
|-id=535 bgcolor=#E9E9E9
| 82535 ||  || — || July 24, 2001 || Haleakala || NEAT || — || align=right | 2.9 km || 
|-id=536 bgcolor=#fefefe
| 82536 ||  || — || July 24, 2001 || Haleakala || NEAT || NYS || align=right | 3.0 km || 
|-id=537 bgcolor=#E9E9E9
| 82537 ||  || — || July 27, 2001 || Palomar || NEAT || — || align=right | 2.5 km || 
|-id=538 bgcolor=#fefefe
| 82538 ||  || — || July 24, 2001 || Palomar || NEAT || NYS || align=right | 1.6 km || 
|-id=539 bgcolor=#E9E9E9
| 82539 ||  || — || July 22, 2001 || Palomar || NEAT || HNS || align=right | 3.8 km || 
|-id=540 bgcolor=#d6d6d6
| 82540 ||  || — || July 22, 2001 || Anderson Mesa || LONEOS || — || align=right | 5.2 km || 
|-id=541 bgcolor=#fefefe
| 82541 ||  || — || July 25, 2001 || Haleakala || NEAT || — || align=right | 2.6 km || 
|-id=542 bgcolor=#fefefe
| 82542 ||  || — || July 26, 2001 || Haleakala || NEAT || — || align=right | 1.9 km || 
|-id=543 bgcolor=#E9E9E9
| 82543 ||  || — || July 27, 2001 || Haleakala || NEAT || MAR || align=right | 5.2 km || 
|-id=544 bgcolor=#fefefe
| 82544 ||  || — || July 16, 2001 || Anderson Mesa || LONEOS || NYS || align=right | 1.7 km || 
|-id=545 bgcolor=#E9E9E9
| 82545 ||  || — || July 16, 2001 || Anderson Mesa || LONEOS || — || align=right | 2.7 km || 
|-id=546 bgcolor=#fefefe
| 82546 ||  || — || July 16, 2001 || Anderson Mesa || LONEOS || NYS || align=right | 1.5 km || 
|-id=547 bgcolor=#fefefe
| 82547 ||  || — || July 18, 2001 || Palomar || NEAT || NYS || align=right | 5.2 km || 
|-id=548 bgcolor=#E9E9E9
| 82548 ||  || — || July 18, 2001 || Haleakala || NEAT || — || align=right | 2.9 km || 
|-id=549 bgcolor=#E9E9E9
| 82549 ||  || — || July 19, 2001 || Anderson Mesa || LONEOS || — || align=right | 1.6 km || 
|-id=550 bgcolor=#fefefe
| 82550 ||  || — || July 20, 2001 || Palomar || NEAT || NYS || align=right | 3.3 km || 
|-id=551 bgcolor=#fefefe
| 82551 ||  || — || July 20, 2001 || Palomar || NEAT || — || align=right | 1.8 km || 
|-id=552 bgcolor=#E9E9E9
| 82552 ||  || — || July 20, 2001 || Palomar || NEAT || — || align=right | 3.2 km || 
|-id=553 bgcolor=#E9E9E9
| 82553 ||  || — || July 20, 2001 || Palomar || NEAT || — || align=right | 2.5 km || 
|-id=554 bgcolor=#d6d6d6
| 82554 ||  || — || July 21, 2001 || Anderson Mesa || LONEOS || HYG || align=right | 7.1 km || 
|-id=555 bgcolor=#d6d6d6
| 82555 ||  || — || July 17, 2001 || Palomar || NEAT || KOR || align=right | 3.1 km || 
|-id=556 bgcolor=#E9E9E9
| 82556 ||  || — || July 24, 2001 || Palomar || NEAT || — || align=right | 4.9 km || 
|-id=557 bgcolor=#d6d6d6
| 82557 ||  || — || July 24, 2001 || Palomar || NEAT || — || align=right | 6.0 km || 
|-id=558 bgcolor=#d6d6d6
| 82558 ||  || — || July 22, 2001 || Palomar || NEAT || — || align=right | 4.7 km || 
|-id=559 bgcolor=#E9E9E9
| 82559 Emilbřezina ||  ||  || July 28, 2001 || Ondřejov || Ondřejov Obs. || — || align=right | 2.2 km || 
|-id=560 bgcolor=#fefefe
| 82560 ||  || — || July 26, 2001 || Palomar || NEAT || V || align=right | 1.5 km || 
|-id=561 bgcolor=#d6d6d6
| 82561 ||  || — || July 26, 2001 || Palomar || NEAT || — || align=right | 7.4 km || 
|-id=562 bgcolor=#d6d6d6
| 82562 ||  || — || July 26, 2001 || Palomar || NEAT || — || align=right | 5.5 km || 
|-id=563 bgcolor=#E9E9E9
| 82563 ||  || — || July 26, 2001 || Palomar || NEAT || — || align=right | 2.3 km || 
|-id=564 bgcolor=#E9E9E9
| 82564 ||  || — || July 29, 2001 || Palomar || NEAT || HOF || align=right | 5.1 km || 
|-id=565 bgcolor=#E9E9E9
| 82565 ||  || — || July 29, 2001 || Palomar || NEAT || HNS || align=right | 3.0 km || 
|-id=566 bgcolor=#E9E9E9
| 82566 ||  || — || July 29, 2001 || Socorro || LINEAR || EUN || align=right | 3.8 km || 
|-id=567 bgcolor=#d6d6d6
| 82567 ||  || — || July 26, 2001 || Haleakala || NEAT || — || align=right | 5.8 km || 
|-id=568 bgcolor=#d6d6d6
| 82568 ||  || — || July 26, 2001 || Haleakala || NEAT || — || align=right | 5.7 km || 
|-id=569 bgcolor=#fefefe
| 82569 ||  || — || July 31, 2001 || Farpoint || G. Hug || — || align=right | 2.2 km || 
|-id=570 bgcolor=#fefefe
| 82570 ||  || — || July 27, 2001 || Palomar || NEAT || — || align=right | 2.7 km || 
|-id=571 bgcolor=#fefefe
| 82571 ||  || — || July 27, 2001 || Palomar || NEAT || — || align=right | 3.0 km || 
|-id=572 bgcolor=#d6d6d6
| 82572 ||  || — || July 27, 2001 || Palomar || NEAT || — || align=right | 11 km || 
|-id=573 bgcolor=#d6d6d6
| 82573 ||  || — || July 20, 2001 || Anderson Mesa || LONEOS || — || align=right | 6.9 km || 
|-id=574 bgcolor=#E9E9E9
| 82574 ||  || — || July 20, 2001 || Anderson Mesa || LONEOS || — || align=right | 3.6 km || 
|-id=575 bgcolor=#E9E9E9
| 82575 ||  || — || July 20, 2001 || Anderson Mesa || LONEOS || — || align=right | 2.0 km || 
|-id=576 bgcolor=#E9E9E9
| 82576 ||  || — || July 21, 2001 || Kitt Peak || Spacewatch || — || align=right | 2.3 km || 
|-id=577 bgcolor=#E9E9E9
| 82577 ||  || — || July 28, 2001 || Haleakala || NEAT || — || align=right | 2.6 km || 
|-id=578 bgcolor=#E9E9E9
| 82578 ||  || — || July 28, 2001 || Haleakala || NEAT || — || align=right | 2.8 km || 
|-id=579 bgcolor=#E9E9E9
| 82579 ||  || — || July 29, 2001 || Palomar || NEAT || — || align=right | 3.0 km || 
|-id=580 bgcolor=#d6d6d6
| 82580 ||  || — || July 29, 2001 || Palomar || NEAT || EOS || align=right | 4.9 km || 
|-id=581 bgcolor=#d6d6d6
| 82581 ||  || — || July 29, 2001 || Palomar || NEAT || — || align=right | 9.9 km || 
|-id=582 bgcolor=#d6d6d6
| 82582 ||  || — || July 29, 2001 || Palomar || NEAT || NAE || align=right | 8.1 km || 
|-id=583 bgcolor=#d6d6d6
| 82583 ||  || — || July 29, 2001 || Palomar || NEAT || EOS || align=right | 3.8 km || 
|-id=584 bgcolor=#E9E9E9
| 82584 ||  || — || July 29, 2001 || Palomar || NEAT || EUN || align=right | 3.5 km || 
|-id=585 bgcolor=#fefefe
| 82585 ||  || — || July 30, 2001 || Palomar || NEAT || — || align=right | 6.3 km || 
|-id=586 bgcolor=#d6d6d6
| 82586 ||  || — || July 21, 2001 || Haleakala || NEAT || — || align=right | 4.1 km || 
|-id=587 bgcolor=#d6d6d6
| 82587 ||  || — || July 21, 2001 || Haleakala || NEAT || — || align=right | 6.2 km || 
|-id=588 bgcolor=#E9E9E9
| 82588 ||  || — || July 21, 2001 || Haleakala || NEAT || — || align=right | 3.7 km || 
|-id=589 bgcolor=#E9E9E9
| 82589 ||  || — || July 22, 2001 || Socorro || LINEAR || — || align=right | 2.0 km || 
|-id=590 bgcolor=#d6d6d6
| 82590 ||  || — || July 22, 2001 || Socorro || LINEAR || HYG || align=right | 8.0 km || 
|-id=591 bgcolor=#d6d6d6
| 82591 ||  || — || July 23, 2001 || Haleakala || NEAT || — || align=right | 5.4 km || 
|-id=592 bgcolor=#fefefe
| 82592 ||  || — || July 25, 2001 || Haleakala || NEAT || — || align=right | 3.0 km || 
|-id=593 bgcolor=#d6d6d6
| 82593 ||  || — || July 25, 2001 || Haleakala || NEAT || 628 || align=right | 4.3 km || 
|-id=594 bgcolor=#E9E9E9
| 82594 ||  || — || July 29, 2001 || Palomar || NEAT || GEF || align=right | 2.8 km || 
|-id=595 bgcolor=#E9E9E9
| 82595 ||  || — || July 23, 2001 || Haleakala || NEAT || — || align=right | 2.4 km || 
|-id=596 bgcolor=#d6d6d6
| 82596 ||  || — || July 25, 2001 || Palomar || NEAT || EOS || align=right | 4.8 km || 
|-id=597 bgcolor=#fefefe
| 82597 ||  || — || July 25, 2001 || Haleakala || NEAT || NYS || align=right | 4.2 km || 
|-id=598 bgcolor=#fefefe
| 82598 ||  || — || July 29, 2001 || Palomar || NEAT || — || align=right | 2.1 km || 
|-id=599 bgcolor=#fefefe
| 82599 ||  || — || July 31, 2001 || Palomar || NEAT || — || align=right | 2.7 km || 
|-id=600 bgcolor=#E9E9E9
| 82600 ||  || — || July 25, 2001 || Bergisch Gladbach || W. Bickel || — || align=right | 2.4 km || 
|}

82601–82700 

|-bgcolor=#E9E9E9
| 82601 ||  || — || July 29, 2001 || Bergisch Gladbach || W. Bickel || EUN || align=right | 4.3 km || 
|-id=602 bgcolor=#E9E9E9
| 82602 ||  || — || July 23, 2001 || Haleakala || NEAT || — || align=right | 3.6 km || 
|-id=603 bgcolor=#E9E9E9
| 82603 ||  || — || July 24, 2001 || Palomar || NEAT || EUN || align=right | 5.0 km || 
|-id=604 bgcolor=#E9E9E9
| 82604 ||  || — || July 24, 2001 || Palomar || NEAT || — || align=right | 2.5 km || 
|-id=605 bgcolor=#d6d6d6
| 82605 ||  || — || July 25, 2001 || Haleakala || NEAT || — || align=right | 6.8 km || 
|-id=606 bgcolor=#fefefe
| 82606 ||  || — || July 25, 2001 || Haleakala || NEAT || NYS || align=right | 2.2 km || 
|-id=607 bgcolor=#E9E9E9
| 82607 ||  || — || July 25, 2001 || Haleakala || NEAT || EUN || align=right | 2.8 km || 
|-id=608 bgcolor=#d6d6d6
| 82608 ||  || — || July 27, 2001 || Anderson Mesa || LONEOS || HYG || align=right | 5.6 km || 
|-id=609 bgcolor=#E9E9E9
| 82609 ||  || — || July 27, 2001 || Anderson Mesa || LONEOS || — || align=right | 2.9 km || 
|-id=610 bgcolor=#fefefe
| 82610 ||  || — || July 27, 2001 || Anderson Mesa || LONEOS || NYS || align=right | 1.2 km || 
|-id=611 bgcolor=#E9E9E9
| 82611 ||  || — || July 27, 2001 || Palomar || NEAT || — || align=right | 3.0 km || 
|-id=612 bgcolor=#E9E9E9
| 82612 ||  || — || July 27, 2001 || Haleakala || NEAT || — || align=right | 6.1 km || 
|-id=613 bgcolor=#fefefe
| 82613 ||  || — || July 27, 2001 || Haleakala || NEAT || — || align=right | 2.3 km || 
|-id=614 bgcolor=#E9E9E9
| 82614 ||  || — || July 27, 2001 || Haleakala || NEAT || WIT || align=right | 2.7 km || 
|-id=615 bgcolor=#fefefe
| 82615 ||  || — || July 28, 2001 || Anderson Mesa || LONEOS || FLO || align=right | 1.8 km || 
|-id=616 bgcolor=#E9E9E9
| 82616 ||  || — || July 28, 2001 || Anderson Mesa || LONEOS || — || align=right | 3.6 km || 
|-id=617 bgcolor=#fefefe
| 82617 ||  || — || July 28, 2001 || Anderson Mesa || LONEOS || — || align=right | 2.0 km || 
|-id=618 bgcolor=#d6d6d6
| 82618 ||  || — || July 28, 2001 || Anderson Mesa || LONEOS || — || align=right | 7.4 km || 
|-id=619 bgcolor=#E9E9E9
| 82619 ||  || — || July 28, 2001 || Haleakala || NEAT || — || align=right | 3.4 km || 
|-id=620 bgcolor=#E9E9E9
| 82620 ||  || — || July 28, 2001 || Haleakala || NEAT || — || align=right | 2.6 km || 
|-id=621 bgcolor=#d6d6d6
| 82621 ||  || — || July 28, 2001 || Haleakala || NEAT || — || align=right | 7.5 km || 
|-id=622 bgcolor=#E9E9E9
| 82622 ||  || — || July 28, 2001 || Haleakala || NEAT || — || align=right | 5.6 km || 
|-id=623 bgcolor=#d6d6d6
| 82623 ||  || — || July 29, 2001 || Anderson Mesa || LONEOS || TIR || align=right | 7.2 km || 
|-id=624 bgcolor=#d6d6d6
| 82624 ||  || — || July 29, 2001 || Anderson Mesa || LONEOS || — || align=right | 5.8 km || 
|-id=625 bgcolor=#E9E9E9
| 82625 ||  || — || July 29, 2001 || Palomar || NEAT || EUN || align=right | 4.2 km || 
|-id=626 bgcolor=#E9E9E9
| 82626 ||  || — || July 28, 2001 || Anderson Mesa || LONEOS || — || align=right | 3.5 km || 
|-id=627 bgcolor=#d6d6d6
| 82627 ||  || — || July 28, 2001 || Anderson Mesa || LONEOS || — || align=right | 7.4 km || 
|-id=628 bgcolor=#d6d6d6
| 82628 ||  || — || July 28, 2001 || Anderson Mesa || LONEOS || EOS || align=right | 5.2 km || 
|-id=629 bgcolor=#d6d6d6
| 82629 ||  || — || July 28, 2001 || Anderson Mesa || LONEOS || — || align=right | 4.8 km || 
|-id=630 bgcolor=#E9E9E9
| 82630 ||  || — || July 29, 2001 || Socorro || LINEAR || GEF || align=right | 3.0 km || 
|-id=631 bgcolor=#E9E9E9
| 82631 ||  || — || July 29, 2001 || Socorro || LINEAR || RAF || align=right | 3.0 km || 
|-id=632 bgcolor=#E9E9E9
| 82632 ||  || — || July 30, 2001 || Socorro || LINEAR || HNS || align=right | 3.4 km || 
|-id=633 bgcolor=#d6d6d6
| 82633 ||  || — || July 31, 2001 || Socorro || LINEAR || EOS || align=right | 6.0 km || 
|-id=634 bgcolor=#d6d6d6
| 82634 ||  || — || July 19, 2001 || Palomar || NEAT || — || align=right | 3.8 km || 
|-id=635 bgcolor=#E9E9E9
| 82635 ||  || — || July 21, 2001 || Haleakala || NEAT || — || align=right | 2.5 km || 
|-id=636 bgcolor=#E9E9E9
| 82636 ||  || — || July 27, 2001 || Anderson Mesa || LONEOS || — || align=right | 5.4 km || 
|-id=637 bgcolor=#fefefe
| 82637 || 2001 PV || — || August 2, 2001 || Haleakala || NEAT || NYS || align=right | 1.2 km || 
|-id=638 bgcolor=#d6d6d6
| 82638 Bottariclaudio ||  ||  || August 7, 2001 || San Marcello || L. Tesi, M. Tombelli || — || align=right | 4.6 km || 
|-id=639 bgcolor=#E9E9E9
| 82639 ||  || — || August 3, 2001 || Haleakala || NEAT || — || align=right | 2.0 km || 
|-id=640 bgcolor=#E9E9E9
| 82640 ||  || — || August 3, 2001 || Haleakala || NEAT || — || align=right | 2.8 km || 
|-id=641 bgcolor=#d6d6d6
| 82641 ||  || — || August 10, 2001 || Palomar || NEAT || — || align=right | 4.9 km || 
|-id=642 bgcolor=#d6d6d6
| 82642 ||  || — || August 10, 2001 || Haleakala || NEAT || — || align=right | 5.7 km || 
|-id=643 bgcolor=#d6d6d6
| 82643 ||  || — || August 10, 2001 || Haleakala || NEAT || — || align=right | 8.6 km || 
|-id=644 bgcolor=#E9E9E9
| 82644 ||  || — || August 10, 2001 || Haleakala || NEAT || — || align=right | 5.0 km || 
|-id=645 bgcolor=#E9E9E9
| 82645 ||  || — || August 11, 2001 || Haleakala || NEAT || — || align=right | 4.1 km || 
|-id=646 bgcolor=#d6d6d6
| 82646 ||  || — || August 11, 2001 || Haleakala || NEAT || — || align=right | 6.4 km || 
|-id=647 bgcolor=#E9E9E9
| 82647 ||  || — || August 8, 2001 || Haleakala || NEAT || — || align=right | 2.4 km || 
|-id=648 bgcolor=#fefefe
| 82648 ||  || — || August 11, 2001 || Palomar || NEAT || — || align=right | 1.9 km || 
|-id=649 bgcolor=#d6d6d6
| 82649 ||  || — || August 11, 2001 || Palomar || NEAT || EOS || align=right | 4.6 km || 
|-id=650 bgcolor=#d6d6d6
| 82650 ||  || — || August 12, 2001 || Palomar || NEAT || — || align=right | 6.4 km || 
|-id=651 bgcolor=#d6d6d6
| 82651 ||  || — || August 12, 2001 || Palomar || NEAT || — || align=right | 8.4 km || 
|-id=652 bgcolor=#E9E9E9
| 82652 ||  || — || August 9, 2001 || Palomar || NEAT || GEF || align=right | 2.4 km || 
|-id=653 bgcolor=#E9E9E9
| 82653 ||  || — || August 13, 2001 || Ondřejov || P. Kušnirák || — || align=right | 4.4 km || 
|-id=654 bgcolor=#E9E9E9
| 82654 ||  || — || August 12, 2001 || Farpoint || G. Hug || — || align=right | 6.0 km || 
|-id=655 bgcolor=#E9E9E9
| 82655 ||  || — || August 12, 2001 || Farpoint || G. Hug || — || align=right | 3.5 km || 
|-id=656 bgcolor=#d6d6d6
| 82656 Puskás ||  ||  || August 10, 2001 || Calar Alto || K. Sárneczky, G. Szabó || — || align=right | 5.2 km || 
|-id=657 bgcolor=#fefefe
| 82657 ||  || — || August 14, 2001 || San Marcello || A. Boattini, G. Forti || — || align=right | 2.0 km || 
|-id=658 bgcolor=#E9E9E9
| 82658 ||  || — || August 9, 2001 || Palomar || NEAT || — || align=right | 2.0 km || 
|-id=659 bgcolor=#E9E9E9
| 82659 ||  || — || August 9, 2001 || Palomar || NEAT || — || align=right | 2.1 km || 
|-id=660 bgcolor=#fefefe
| 82660 ||  || — || August 9, 2001 || Palomar || NEAT || V || align=right | 1.7 km || 
|-id=661 bgcolor=#fefefe
| 82661 ||  || — || August 9, 2001 || Palomar || NEAT || — || align=right | 2.2 km || 
|-id=662 bgcolor=#fefefe
| 82662 ||  || — || August 9, 2001 || Palomar || NEAT || PHO || align=right | 2.1 km || 
|-id=663 bgcolor=#d6d6d6
| 82663 ||  || — || August 9, 2001 || Palomar || NEAT || MEL || align=right | 11 km || 
|-id=664 bgcolor=#d6d6d6
| 82664 ||  || — || August 9, 2001 || Palomar || NEAT || EOS || align=right | 3.7 km || 
|-id=665 bgcolor=#d6d6d6
| 82665 ||  || — || August 10, 2001 || Palomar || NEAT || EMA || align=right | 7.0 km || 
|-id=666 bgcolor=#fefefe
| 82666 ||  || — || August 10, 2001 || Palomar || NEAT || — || align=right | 1.5 km || 
|-id=667 bgcolor=#E9E9E9
| 82667 ||  || — || August 10, 2001 || Palomar || NEAT || HNS || align=right | 2.7 km || 
|-id=668 bgcolor=#fefefe
| 82668 ||  || — || August 10, 2001 || Palomar || NEAT || — || align=right | 2.2 km || 
|-id=669 bgcolor=#d6d6d6
| 82669 ||  || — || August 10, 2001 || Haleakala || NEAT || — || align=right | 6.8 km || 
|-id=670 bgcolor=#E9E9E9
| 82670 ||  || — || August 10, 2001 || Haleakala || NEAT || — || align=right | 2.2 km || 
|-id=671 bgcolor=#E9E9E9
| 82671 ||  || — || August 10, 2001 || Haleakala || NEAT || — || align=right | 5.3 km || 
|-id=672 bgcolor=#d6d6d6
| 82672 ||  || — || August 10, 2001 || Haleakala || NEAT || — || align=right | 6.5 km || 
|-id=673 bgcolor=#E9E9E9
| 82673 ||  || — || August 10, 2001 || Haleakala || NEAT || — || align=right | 5.7 km || 
|-id=674 bgcolor=#d6d6d6
| 82674 ||  || — || August 10, 2001 || Haleakala || NEAT || — || align=right | 4.3 km || 
|-id=675 bgcolor=#d6d6d6
| 82675 ||  || — || August 11, 2001 || Haleakala || NEAT || — || align=right | 4.9 km || 
|-id=676 bgcolor=#FA8072
| 82676 ||  || — || August 11, 2001 || Haleakala || NEAT || — || align=right | 2.9 km || 
|-id=677 bgcolor=#d6d6d6
| 82677 ||  || — || August 11, 2001 || Haleakala || NEAT || — || align=right | 2.7 km || 
|-id=678 bgcolor=#E9E9E9
| 82678 ||  || — || August 11, 2001 || Haleakala || NEAT || — || align=right | 6.2 km || 
|-id=679 bgcolor=#E9E9E9
| 82679 ||  || — || August 11, 2001 || Haleakala || NEAT || HOF || align=right | 8.6 km || 
|-id=680 bgcolor=#E9E9E9
| 82680 ||  || — || August 11, 2001 || Haleakala || NEAT || — || align=right | 8.3 km || 
|-id=681 bgcolor=#fefefe
| 82681 ||  || — || August 11, 2001 || Haleakala || NEAT || NYS || align=right | 1.7 km || 
|-id=682 bgcolor=#E9E9E9
| 82682 ||  || — || August 11, 2001 || Haleakala || NEAT || — || align=right | 2.2 km || 
|-id=683 bgcolor=#d6d6d6
| 82683 ||  || — || August 11, 2001 || Haleakala || NEAT || — || align=right | 5.0 km || 
|-id=684 bgcolor=#E9E9E9
| 82684 ||  || — || August 14, 2001 || Palomar || NEAT || — || align=right | 2.1 km || 
|-id=685 bgcolor=#E9E9E9
| 82685 ||  || — || August 10, 2001 || Palomar || NEAT || — || align=right | 3.0 km || 
|-id=686 bgcolor=#d6d6d6
| 82686 ||  || — || August 10, 2001 || Palomar || NEAT || — || align=right | 9.1 km || 
|-id=687 bgcolor=#d6d6d6
| 82687 ||  || — || August 10, 2001 || Palomar || NEAT || — || align=right | 7.0 km || 
|-id=688 bgcolor=#d6d6d6
| 82688 ||  || — || August 10, 2001 || Palomar || NEAT || — || align=right | 6.2 km || 
|-id=689 bgcolor=#d6d6d6
| 82689 ||  || — || August 10, 2001 || Palomar || NEAT || — || align=right | 5.4 km || 
|-id=690 bgcolor=#fefefe
| 82690 ||  || — || August 10, 2001 || Palomar || NEAT || — || align=right | 3.0 km || 
|-id=691 bgcolor=#d6d6d6
| 82691 ||  || — || August 10, 2001 || Palomar || NEAT || EOS || align=right | 9.4 km || 
|-id=692 bgcolor=#E9E9E9
| 82692 ||  || — || August 10, 2001 || Palomar || NEAT || — || align=right | 4.8 km || 
|-id=693 bgcolor=#d6d6d6
| 82693 ||  || — || August 10, 2001 || Palomar || NEAT || — || align=right | 4.2 km || 
|-id=694 bgcolor=#d6d6d6
| 82694 ||  || — || August 10, 2001 || Palomar || NEAT || EOS || align=right | 5.7 km || 
|-id=695 bgcolor=#fefefe
| 82695 ||  || — || August 11, 2001 || Palomar || NEAT || FLO || align=right | 4.1 km || 
|-id=696 bgcolor=#E9E9E9
| 82696 ||  || — || August 11, 2001 || Palomar || NEAT || MAR || align=right | 2.9 km || 
|-id=697 bgcolor=#E9E9E9
| 82697 ||  || — || August 11, 2001 || Palomar || NEAT || — || align=right | 2.8 km || 
|-id=698 bgcolor=#E9E9E9
| 82698 ||  || — || August 11, 2001 || Palomar || NEAT || EUN || align=right | 3.4 km || 
|-id=699 bgcolor=#E9E9E9
| 82699 ||  || — || August 11, 2001 || Palomar || NEAT || MAR || align=right | 3.2 km || 
|-id=700 bgcolor=#fefefe
| 82700 ||  || — || August 11, 2001 || Palomar || NEAT || — || align=right | 5.9 km || 
|}

82701–82800 

|-bgcolor=#E9E9E9
| 82701 ||  || — || August 11, 2001 || Haleakala || NEAT || ADE || align=right | 5.9 km || 
|-id=702 bgcolor=#d6d6d6
| 82702 ||  || — || August 11, 2001 || Palomar || NEAT || — || align=right | 6.0 km || 
|-id=703 bgcolor=#d6d6d6
| 82703 ||  || — || August 11, 2001 || Palomar || NEAT || EOS || align=right | 5.3 km || 
|-id=704 bgcolor=#E9E9E9
| 82704 ||  || — || August 11, 2001 || Palomar || NEAT || GEF || align=right | 2.6 km || 
|-id=705 bgcolor=#E9E9E9
| 82705 ||  || — || August 11, 2001 || Palomar || NEAT || — || align=right | 6.1 km || 
|-id=706 bgcolor=#d6d6d6
| 82706 ||  || — || August 11, 2001 || Palomar || NEAT || 615 || align=right | 5.2 km || 
|-id=707 bgcolor=#E9E9E9
| 82707 ||  || — || August 12, 2001 || Palomar || NEAT || — || align=right | 5.8 km || 
|-id=708 bgcolor=#E9E9E9
| 82708 ||  || — || August 12, 2001 || Palomar || NEAT || — || align=right | 3.1 km || 
|-id=709 bgcolor=#d6d6d6
| 82709 ||  || — || August 13, 2001 || Haleakala || NEAT || — || align=right | 5.7 km || 
|-id=710 bgcolor=#d6d6d6
| 82710 ||  || — || August 15, 2001 || Haleakala || NEAT || — || align=right | 5.5 km || 
|-id=711 bgcolor=#d6d6d6
| 82711 ||  || — || August 11, 2001 || Haleakala || NEAT || SAN || align=right | 3.4 km || 
|-id=712 bgcolor=#E9E9E9
| 82712 ||  || — || August 12, 2001 || Palomar || NEAT || — || align=right | 3.0 km || 
|-id=713 bgcolor=#d6d6d6
| 82713 ||  || — || August 12, 2001 || Palomar || NEAT || — || align=right | 7.8 km || 
|-id=714 bgcolor=#E9E9E9
| 82714 ||  || — || August 13, 2001 || Bergisch Gladbach || W. Bickel || — || align=right | 3.2 km || 
|-id=715 bgcolor=#d6d6d6
| 82715 ||  || — || August 13, 2001 || Haleakala || NEAT || — || align=right | 7.0 km || 
|-id=716 bgcolor=#E9E9E9
| 82716 ||  || — || August 13, 2001 || Haleakala || NEAT || — || align=right | 6.8 km || 
|-id=717 bgcolor=#d6d6d6
| 82717 ||  || — || August 14, 2001 || Haleakala || NEAT || — || align=right | 8.5 km || 
|-id=718 bgcolor=#E9E9E9
| 82718 ||  || — || August 14, 2001 || Palomar || NEAT || MAR || align=right | 2.6 km || 
|-id=719 bgcolor=#E9E9E9
| 82719 ||  || — || August 13, 2001 || Palomar || NEAT || — || align=right | 4.7 km || 
|-id=720 bgcolor=#d6d6d6
| 82720 ||  || — || August 15, 2001 || Haleakala || NEAT || — || align=right | 5.4 km || 
|-id=721 bgcolor=#fefefe
| 82721 ||  || — || August 15, 2001 || Haleakala || NEAT || — || align=right | 1.8 km || 
|-id=722 bgcolor=#d6d6d6
| 82722 ||  || — || August 15, 2001 || Haleakala || NEAT || — || align=right | 5.1 km || 
|-id=723 bgcolor=#d6d6d6
| 82723 ||  || — || August 15, 2001 || Haleakala || NEAT || — || align=right | 8.1 km || 
|-id=724 bgcolor=#d6d6d6
| 82724 ||  || — || August 15, 2001 || Haleakala || NEAT || — || align=right | 4.8 km || 
|-id=725 bgcolor=#d6d6d6
| 82725 ||  || — || August 15, 2001 || Haleakala || NEAT || KOR || align=right | 3.2 km || 
|-id=726 bgcolor=#E9E9E9
| 82726 ||  || — || August 14, 2001 || Haleakala || NEAT || HOF || align=right | 4.8 km || 
|-id=727 bgcolor=#d6d6d6
| 82727 ||  || — || August 14, 2001 || Haleakala || NEAT || — || align=right | 4.4 km || 
|-id=728 bgcolor=#fefefe
| 82728 ||  || — || August 14, 2001 || Haleakala || NEAT || NYS || align=right data-sort-value="0.91" | 910 m || 
|-id=729 bgcolor=#d6d6d6
| 82729 ||  || — || August 14, 2001 || Haleakala || NEAT || — || align=right | 7.0 km || 
|-id=730 bgcolor=#d6d6d6
| 82730 ||  || — || August 14, 2001 || Haleakala || NEAT || KOR || align=right | 3.1 km || 
|-id=731 bgcolor=#d6d6d6
| 82731 ||  || — || August 14, 2001 || Haleakala || NEAT || SAN || align=right | 4.9 km || 
|-id=732 bgcolor=#d6d6d6
| 82732 ||  || — || August 14, 2001 || Haleakala || NEAT || ALA || align=right | 7.5 km || 
|-id=733 bgcolor=#d6d6d6
| 82733 ||  || — || August 14, 2001 || Haleakala || NEAT || — || align=right | 7.1 km || 
|-id=734 bgcolor=#E9E9E9
| 82734 ||  || — || August 13, 2001 || Palomar || NEAT || AER || align=right | 2.7 km || 
|-id=735 bgcolor=#E9E9E9
| 82735 ||  || — || August 13, 2001 || Haleakala || NEAT || — || align=right | 4.2 km || 
|-id=736 bgcolor=#d6d6d6
| 82736 ||  || — || August 13, 2001 || Palomar || NEAT || — || align=right | 8.6 km || 
|-id=737 bgcolor=#d6d6d6
| 82737 ||  || — || August 12, 2001 || Palomar || NEAT || — || align=right | 8.9 km || 
|-id=738 bgcolor=#E9E9E9
| 82738 || 2001 QA || — || August 16, 2001 || Farpoint || Farpoint Obs. || — || align=right | 3.2 km || 
|-id=739 bgcolor=#d6d6d6
| 82739 || 2001 QU || — || August 16, 2001 || Socorro || LINEAR || — || align=right | 4.5 km || 
|-id=740 bgcolor=#fefefe
| 82740 || 2001 QY || — || August 16, 2001 || Socorro || LINEAR || NYS || align=right | 1.8 km || 
|-id=741 bgcolor=#d6d6d6
| 82741 ||  || — || August 16, 2001 || Socorro || LINEAR || — || align=right | 5.5 km || 
|-id=742 bgcolor=#fefefe
| 82742 ||  || — || August 17, 2001 || Socorro || LINEAR || — || align=right | 4.9 km || 
|-id=743 bgcolor=#E9E9E9
| 82743 ||  || — || August 16, 2001 || Socorro || LINEAR || — || align=right | 3.0 km || 
|-id=744 bgcolor=#E9E9E9
| 82744 ||  || — || August 16, 2001 || Socorro || LINEAR || — || align=right | 5.5 km || 
|-id=745 bgcolor=#E9E9E9
| 82745 ||  || — || August 16, 2001 || Socorro || LINEAR || — || align=right | 5.2 km || 
|-id=746 bgcolor=#d6d6d6
| 82746 ||  || — || August 16, 2001 || Socorro || LINEAR || — || align=right | 5.5 km || 
|-id=747 bgcolor=#E9E9E9
| 82747 ||  || — || August 16, 2001 || Socorro || LINEAR || — || align=right | 2.1 km || 
|-id=748 bgcolor=#fefefe
| 82748 ||  || — || August 16, 2001 || Socorro || LINEAR || NYS || align=right | 1.2 km || 
|-id=749 bgcolor=#E9E9E9
| 82749 ||  || — || August 16, 2001 || Socorro || LINEAR || AGN || align=right | 2.5 km || 
|-id=750 bgcolor=#fefefe
| 82750 ||  || — || August 16, 2001 || Socorro || LINEAR || — || align=right | 1.8 km || 
|-id=751 bgcolor=#E9E9E9
| 82751 ||  || — || August 16, 2001 || Socorro || LINEAR || — || align=right | 2.4 km || 
|-id=752 bgcolor=#d6d6d6
| 82752 ||  || — || August 16, 2001 || Socorro || LINEAR || — || align=right | 4.7 km || 
|-id=753 bgcolor=#d6d6d6
| 82753 ||  || — || August 16, 2001 || Socorro || LINEAR || KOR || align=right | 4.3 km || 
|-id=754 bgcolor=#d6d6d6
| 82754 ||  || — || August 16, 2001 || Socorro || LINEAR || — || align=right | 4.6 km || 
|-id=755 bgcolor=#E9E9E9
| 82755 ||  || — || August 16, 2001 || Socorro || LINEAR || — || align=right | 4.7 km || 
|-id=756 bgcolor=#fefefe
| 82756 ||  || — || August 16, 2001 || Socorro || LINEAR || NYS || align=right | 1.8 km || 
|-id=757 bgcolor=#E9E9E9
| 82757 ||  || — || August 16, 2001 || Socorro || LINEAR || — || align=right | 3.0 km || 
|-id=758 bgcolor=#E9E9E9
| 82758 ||  || — || August 16, 2001 || Socorro || LINEAR || HNS || align=right | 2.9 km || 
|-id=759 bgcolor=#E9E9E9
| 82759 ||  || — || August 16, 2001 || Socorro || LINEAR || — || align=right | 3.3 km || 
|-id=760 bgcolor=#d6d6d6
| 82760 ||  || — || August 16, 2001 || Socorro || LINEAR || KOR || align=right | 3.0 km || 
|-id=761 bgcolor=#E9E9E9
| 82761 ||  || — || August 16, 2001 || Socorro || LINEAR || WIT || align=right | 2.9 km || 
|-id=762 bgcolor=#fefefe
| 82762 ||  || — || August 16, 2001 || Socorro || LINEAR || NYS || align=right | 1.3 km || 
|-id=763 bgcolor=#E9E9E9
| 82763 ||  || — || August 16, 2001 || Socorro || LINEAR || — || align=right | 3.3 km || 
|-id=764 bgcolor=#d6d6d6
| 82764 ||  || — || August 16, 2001 || Socorro || LINEAR || — || align=right | 8.8 km || 
|-id=765 bgcolor=#E9E9E9
| 82765 ||  || — || August 16, 2001 || Socorro || LINEAR || NEM || align=right | 4.4 km || 
|-id=766 bgcolor=#d6d6d6
| 82766 ||  || — || August 16, 2001 || Socorro || LINEAR || EOS || align=right | 7.0 km || 
|-id=767 bgcolor=#d6d6d6
| 82767 ||  || — || August 16, 2001 || Socorro || LINEAR || THM || align=right | 8.8 km || 
|-id=768 bgcolor=#d6d6d6
| 82768 ||  || — || August 16, 2001 || Socorro || LINEAR || THM || align=right | 6.5 km || 
|-id=769 bgcolor=#E9E9E9
| 82769 ||  || — || August 16, 2001 || Socorro || LINEAR || — || align=right | 3.5 km || 
|-id=770 bgcolor=#E9E9E9
| 82770 ||  || — || August 16, 2001 || Socorro || LINEAR || — || align=right | 2.5 km || 
|-id=771 bgcolor=#d6d6d6
| 82771 ||  || — || August 16, 2001 || Socorro || LINEAR || — || align=right | 6.6 km || 
|-id=772 bgcolor=#E9E9E9
| 82772 ||  || — || August 16, 2001 || Socorro || LINEAR || — || align=right | 2.8 km || 
|-id=773 bgcolor=#E9E9E9
| 82773 ||  || — || August 16, 2001 || Socorro || LINEAR || — || align=right | 7.4 km || 
|-id=774 bgcolor=#d6d6d6
| 82774 ||  || — || August 16, 2001 || Socorro || LINEAR || — || align=right | 7.8 km || 
|-id=775 bgcolor=#d6d6d6
| 82775 ||  || — || August 16, 2001 || Socorro || LINEAR || KOR || align=right | 3.1 km || 
|-id=776 bgcolor=#E9E9E9
| 82776 ||  || — || August 16, 2001 || Socorro || LINEAR || HEN || align=right | 2.3 km || 
|-id=777 bgcolor=#fefefe
| 82777 ||  || — || August 16, 2001 || Socorro || LINEAR || V || align=right | 1.6 km || 
|-id=778 bgcolor=#d6d6d6
| 82778 ||  || — || August 16, 2001 || Socorro || LINEAR || — || align=right | 6.4 km || 
|-id=779 bgcolor=#d6d6d6
| 82779 ||  || — || August 16, 2001 || Socorro || LINEAR || THM || align=right | 7.7 km || 
|-id=780 bgcolor=#d6d6d6
| 82780 ||  || — || August 16, 2001 || Socorro || LINEAR || KAR || align=right | 2.9 km || 
|-id=781 bgcolor=#d6d6d6
| 82781 ||  || — || August 16, 2001 || Socorro || LINEAR || — || align=right | 7.4 km || 
|-id=782 bgcolor=#d6d6d6
| 82782 ||  || — || August 16, 2001 || Socorro || LINEAR || — || align=right | 4.3 km || 
|-id=783 bgcolor=#E9E9E9
| 82783 ||  || — || August 16, 2001 || Socorro || LINEAR || — || align=right | 4.5 km || 
|-id=784 bgcolor=#E9E9E9
| 82784 ||  || — || August 16, 2001 || Socorro || LINEAR || — || align=right | 3.3 km || 
|-id=785 bgcolor=#d6d6d6
| 82785 ||  || — || August 16, 2001 || Socorro || LINEAR || KOR || align=right | 3.9 km || 
|-id=786 bgcolor=#d6d6d6
| 82786 ||  || — || August 16, 2001 || Socorro || LINEAR || ALA || align=right | 9.9 km || 
|-id=787 bgcolor=#d6d6d6
| 82787 ||  || — || August 16, 2001 || Socorro || LINEAR || SAN || align=right | 3.3 km || 
|-id=788 bgcolor=#fefefe
| 82788 ||  || — || August 16, 2001 || Socorro || LINEAR || NYS || align=right | 5.2 km || 
|-id=789 bgcolor=#fefefe
| 82789 ||  || — || August 16, 2001 || Socorro || LINEAR || MAS || align=right | 2.0 km || 
|-id=790 bgcolor=#E9E9E9
| 82790 ||  || — || August 16, 2001 || Socorro || LINEAR || GEF || align=right | 3.6 km || 
|-id=791 bgcolor=#fefefe
| 82791 ||  || — || August 16, 2001 || Socorro || LINEAR || NYS || align=right | 1.4 km || 
|-id=792 bgcolor=#E9E9E9
| 82792 ||  || — || August 16, 2001 || Socorro || LINEAR || — || align=right | 7.0 km || 
|-id=793 bgcolor=#E9E9E9
| 82793 ||  || — || August 16, 2001 || Socorro || LINEAR || — || align=right | 4.0 km || 
|-id=794 bgcolor=#E9E9E9
| 82794 ||  || — || August 16, 2001 || Socorro || LINEAR || — || align=right | 2.4 km || 
|-id=795 bgcolor=#E9E9E9
| 82795 ||  || — || August 16, 2001 || Socorro || LINEAR || MAR || align=right | 3.1 km || 
|-id=796 bgcolor=#d6d6d6
| 82796 ||  || — || August 16, 2001 || Socorro || LINEAR || KOR || align=right | 4.3 km || 
|-id=797 bgcolor=#E9E9E9
| 82797 ||  || — || August 16, 2001 || Socorro || LINEAR || BRU || align=right | 6.5 km || 
|-id=798 bgcolor=#d6d6d6
| 82798 ||  || — || August 16, 2001 || Socorro || LINEAR || — || align=right | 5.8 km || 
|-id=799 bgcolor=#E9E9E9
| 82799 ||  || — || August 16, 2001 || Socorro || LINEAR || HOF || align=right | 4.6 km || 
|-id=800 bgcolor=#fefefe
| 82800 ||  || — || August 16, 2001 || Socorro || LINEAR || NYS || align=right | 3.5 km || 
|}

82801–82900 

|-bgcolor=#d6d6d6
| 82801 ||  || — || August 16, 2001 || Socorro || LINEAR || — || align=right | 7.2 km || 
|-id=802 bgcolor=#fefefe
| 82802 ||  || — || August 16, 2001 || Socorro || LINEAR || — || align=right | 2.6 km || 
|-id=803 bgcolor=#d6d6d6
| 82803 ||  || — || August 16, 2001 || Socorro || LINEAR || — || align=right | 6.2 km || 
|-id=804 bgcolor=#d6d6d6
| 82804 ||  || — || August 16, 2001 || Socorro || LINEAR || BRA || align=right | 5.4 km || 
|-id=805 bgcolor=#d6d6d6
| 82805 ||  || — || August 16, 2001 || Socorro || LINEAR || — || align=right | 14 km || 
|-id=806 bgcolor=#E9E9E9
| 82806 ||  || — || August 16, 2001 || Socorro || LINEAR || — || align=right | 2.2 km || 
|-id=807 bgcolor=#d6d6d6
| 82807 ||  || — || August 17, 2001 || Socorro || LINEAR || LUT || align=right | 8.0 km || 
|-id=808 bgcolor=#d6d6d6
| 82808 ||  || — || August 17, 2001 || Palomar || NEAT || KOR || align=right | 2.9 km || 
|-id=809 bgcolor=#d6d6d6
| 82809 ||  || — || August 17, 2001 || Ondřejov || P. Kušnirák, U. Babiaková || — || align=right | 7.0 km || 
|-id=810 bgcolor=#E9E9E9
| 82810 ||  || — || August 16, 2001 || Socorro || LINEAR || GEF || align=right | 3.1 km || 
|-id=811 bgcolor=#E9E9E9
| 82811 ||  || — || August 16, 2001 || Socorro || LINEAR || — || align=right | 3.8 km || 
|-id=812 bgcolor=#fefefe
| 82812 ||  || — || August 16, 2001 || Socorro || LINEAR || — || align=right | 3.7 km || 
|-id=813 bgcolor=#E9E9E9
| 82813 ||  || — || August 16, 2001 || Socorro || LINEAR || MAR || align=right | 3.0 km || 
|-id=814 bgcolor=#d6d6d6
| 82814 ||  || — || August 16, 2001 || Socorro || LINEAR || — || align=right | 8.6 km || 
|-id=815 bgcolor=#E9E9E9
| 82815 ||  || — || August 16, 2001 || Socorro || LINEAR || — || align=right | 1.9 km || 
|-id=816 bgcolor=#E9E9E9
| 82816 ||  || — || August 16, 2001 || Socorro || LINEAR || — || align=right | 2.8 km || 
|-id=817 bgcolor=#E9E9E9
| 82817 ||  || — || August 16, 2001 || Socorro || LINEAR || — || align=right | 4.2 km || 
|-id=818 bgcolor=#fefefe
| 82818 ||  || — || August 16, 2001 || Socorro || LINEAR || V || align=right | 1.5 km || 
|-id=819 bgcolor=#E9E9E9
| 82819 ||  || — || August 16, 2001 || Socorro || LINEAR || — || align=right | 2.9 km || 
|-id=820 bgcolor=#E9E9E9
| 82820 ||  || — || August 16, 2001 || Socorro || LINEAR || — || align=right | 4.1 km || 
|-id=821 bgcolor=#fefefe
| 82821 ||  || — || August 16, 2001 || Socorro || LINEAR || — || align=right | 1.9 km || 
|-id=822 bgcolor=#E9E9E9
| 82822 ||  || — || August 16, 2001 || Socorro || LINEAR || — || align=right | 5.1 km || 
|-id=823 bgcolor=#E9E9E9
| 82823 ||  || — || August 16, 2001 || Socorro || LINEAR || AEO || align=right | 2.7 km || 
|-id=824 bgcolor=#E9E9E9
| 82824 ||  || — || August 16, 2001 || Socorro || LINEAR || — || align=right | 3.2 km || 
|-id=825 bgcolor=#fefefe
| 82825 ||  || — || August 16, 2001 || Socorro || LINEAR || — || align=right | 1.5 km || 
|-id=826 bgcolor=#fefefe
| 82826 ||  || — || August 16, 2001 || Socorro || LINEAR || V || align=right | 1.4 km || 
|-id=827 bgcolor=#d6d6d6
| 82827 ||  || — || August 16, 2001 || Socorro || LINEAR || — || align=right | 5.3 km || 
|-id=828 bgcolor=#d6d6d6
| 82828 ||  || — || August 16, 2001 || Socorro || LINEAR || EOS || align=right | 3.5 km || 
|-id=829 bgcolor=#fefefe
| 82829 ||  || — || August 16, 2001 || Socorro || LINEAR || V || align=right | 1.4 km || 
|-id=830 bgcolor=#d6d6d6
| 82830 ||  || — || August 16, 2001 || Socorro || LINEAR || — || align=right | 4.8 km || 
|-id=831 bgcolor=#fefefe
| 82831 ||  || — || August 16, 2001 || Socorro || LINEAR || — || align=right | 1.5 km || 
|-id=832 bgcolor=#E9E9E9
| 82832 ||  || — || August 16, 2001 || Socorro || LINEAR || GEF || align=right | 3.4 km || 
|-id=833 bgcolor=#d6d6d6
| 82833 ||  || — || August 16, 2001 || Socorro || LINEAR || — || align=right | 4.0 km || 
|-id=834 bgcolor=#E9E9E9
| 82834 ||  || — || August 16, 2001 || Socorro || LINEAR || PAD || align=right | 3.4 km || 
|-id=835 bgcolor=#d6d6d6
| 82835 ||  || — || August 16, 2001 || Socorro || LINEAR || HYG || align=right | 5.7 km || 
|-id=836 bgcolor=#E9E9E9
| 82836 ||  || — || August 16, 2001 || Socorro || LINEAR || — || align=right | 2.0 km || 
|-id=837 bgcolor=#E9E9E9
| 82837 ||  || — || August 16, 2001 || Socorro || LINEAR || HNS || align=right | 3.0 km || 
|-id=838 bgcolor=#fefefe
| 82838 ||  || — || August 16, 2001 || Socorro || LINEAR || NYS || align=right | 1.3 km || 
|-id=839 bgcolor=#d6d6d6
| 82839 ||  || — || August 16, 2001 || Socorro || LINEAR || EOS || align=right | 5.0 km || 
|-id=840 bgcolor=#E9E9E9
| 82840 ||  || — || August 16, 2001 || Socorro || LINEAR || AST || align=right | 4.3 km || 
|-id=841 bgcolor=#d6d6d6
| 82841 ||  || — || August 16, 2001 || Socorro || LINEAR || KOR || align=right | 3.1 km || 
|-id=842 bgcolor=#d6d6d6
| 82842 ||  || — || August 16, 2001 || Socorro || LINEAR || THM || align=right | 5.9 km || 
|-id=843 bgcolor=#d6d6d6
| 82843 ||  || — || August 16, 2001 || Socorro || LINEAR || KOR || align=right | 3.5 km || 
|-id=844 bgcolor=#fefefe
| 82844 ||  || — || August 16, 2001 || Socorro || LINEAR || — || align=right | 4.4 km || 
|-id=845 bgcolor=#E9E9E9
| 82845 ||  || — || August 16, 2001 || Socorro || LINEAR || — || align=right | 6.5 km || 
|-id=846 bgcolor=#d6d6d6
| 82846 ||  || — || August 16, 2001 || Socorro || LINEAR || KOR || align=right | 3.2 km || 
|-id=847 bgcolor=#d6d6d6
| 82847 ||  || — || August 16, 2001 || Socorro || LINEAR || KOR || align=right | 3.3 km || 
|-id=848 bgcolor=#E9E9E9
| 82848 ||  || — || August 16, 2001 || Socorro || LINEAR || — || align=right | 3.5 km || 
|-id=849 bgcolor=#E9E9E9
| 82849 ||  || — || August 16, 2001 || Socorro || LINEAR || — || align=right | 3.5 km || 
|-id=850 bgcolor=#E9E9E9
| 82850 ||  || — || August 16, 2001 || Socorro || LINEAR || — || align=right | 3.1 km || 
|-id=851 bgcolor=#d6d6d6
| 82851 ||  || — || August 16, 2001 || Socorro || LINEAR || — || align=right | 4.0 km || 
|-id=852 bgcolor=#d6d6d6
| 82852 ||  || — || August 16, 2001 || Socorro || LINEAR || — || align=right | 4.3 km || 
|-id=853 bgcolor=#d6d6d6
| 82853 ||  || — || August 16, 2001 || Socorro || LINEAR || THM || align=right | 7.9 km || 
|-id=854 bgcolor=#E9E9E9
| 82854 ||  || — || August 16, 2001 || Socorro || LINEAR || — || align=right | 2.0 km || 
|-id=855 bgcolor=#E9E9E9
| 82855 ||  || — || August 16, 2001 || Socorro || LINEAR || — || align=right | 4.3 km || 
|-id=856 bgcolor=#d6d6d6
| 82856 ||  || — || August 16, 2001 || Socorro || LINEAR || — || align=right | 4.8 km || 
|-id=857 bgcolor=#fefefe
| 82857 ||  || — || August 16, 2001 || Socorro || LINEAR || — || align=right | 1.8 km || 
|-id=858 bgcolor=#d6d6d6
| 82858 ||  || — || August 16, 2001 || Socorro || LINEAR || — || align=right | 6.1 km || 
|-id=859 bgcolor=#d6d6d6
| 82859 ||  || — || August 16, 2001 || Socorro || LINEAR || — || align=right | 5.3 km || 
|-id=860 bgcolor=#fefefe
| 82860 ||  || — || August 16, 2001 || Socorro || LINEAR || — || align=right | 2.3 km || 
|-id=861 bgcolor=#E9E9E9
| 82861 ||  || — || August 17, 2001 || Socorro || LINEAR || EUN || align=right | 3.1 km || 
|-id=862 bgcolor=#d6d6d6
| 82862 ||  || — || August 18, 2001 || Socorro || LINEAR || URS || align=right | 7.6 km || 
|-id=863 bgcolor=#d6d6d6
| 82863 ||  || — || August 16, 2001 || Socorro || LINEAR || EOS || align=right | 4.4 km || 
|-id=864 bgcolor=#E9E9E9
| 82864 ||  || — || August 16, 2001 || Socorro || LINEAR || — || align=right | 2.5 km || 
|-id=865 bgcolor=#d6d6d6
| 82865 ||  || — || August 16, 2001 || Socorro || LINEAR || — || align=right | 6.2 km || 
|-id=866 bgcolor=#E9E9E9
| 82866 ||  || — || August 16, 2001 || Socorro || LINEAR || — || align=right | 2.5 km || 
|-id=867 bgcolor=#d6d6d6
| 82867 ||  || — || August 16, 2001 || Socorro || LINEAR || KOR || align=right | 3.5 km || 
|-id=868 bgcolor=#d6d6d6
| 82868 ||  || — || August 16, 2001 || Socorro || LINEAR || — || align=right | 7.5 km || 
|-id=869 bgcolor=#d6d6d6
| 82869 ||  || — || August 16, 2001 || Socorro || LINEAR || KOR || align=right | 4.0 km || 
|-id=870 bgcolor=#d6d6d6
| 82870 ||  || — || August 16, 2001 || Socorro || LINEAR || EOS || align=right | 4.2 km || 
|-id=871 bgcolor=#d6d6d6
| 82871 ||  || — || August 17, 2001 || Socorro || LINEAR || — || align=right | 4.5 km || 
|-id=872 bgcolor=#E9E9E9
| 82872 ||  || — || August 17, 2001 || Socorro || LINEAR || MAR || align=right | 3.0 km || 
|-id=873 bgcolor=#E9E9E9
| 82873 ||  || — || August 17, 2001 || Socorro || LINEAR || — || align=right | 2.9 km || 
|-id=874 bgcolor=#fefefe
| 82874 ||  || — || August 17, 2001 || Socorro || LINEAR || — || align=right | 1.7 km || 
|-id=875 bgcolor=#E9E9E9
| 82875 ||  || — || August 18, 2001 || Socorro || LINEAR || DOR || align=right | 7.0 km || 
|-id=876 bgcolor=#E9E9E9
| 82876 ||  || — || August 19, 2001 || Socorro || LINEAR || — || align=right | 4.3 km || 
|-id=877 bgcolor=#E9E9E9
| 82877 ||  || — || August 20, 2001 || Nashville || R. Clingan || — || align=right | 2.6 km || 
|-id=878 bgcolor=#E9E9E9
| 82878 ||  || — || August 17, 2001 || Socorro || LINEAR || — || align=right | 7.0 km || 
|-id=879 bgcolor=#E9E9E9
| 82879 ||  || — || August 17, 2001 || Socorro || LINEAR || — || align=right | 3.0 km || 
|-id=880 bgcolor=#d6d6d6
| 82880 ||  || — || August 17, 2001 || Socorro || LINEAR || — || align=right | 9.6 km || 
|-id=881 bgcolor=#E9E9E9
| 82881 ||  || — || August 17, 2001 || Socorro || LINEAR || EUN || align=right | 2.8 km || 
|-id=882 bgcolor=#d6d6d6
| 82882 ||  || — || August 16, 2001 || Palomar || NEAT || — || align=right | 14 km || 
|-id=883 bgcolor=#d6d6d6
| 82883 ||  || — || August 19, 2001 || Socorro || LINEAR || ALA || align=right | 7.1 km || 
|-id=884 bgcolor=#E9E9E9
| 82884 ||  || — || August 16, 2001 || Socorro || LINEAR || GEF || align=right | 2.8 km || 
|-id=885 bgcolor=#E9E9E9
| 82885 ||  || — || August 16, 2001 || Socorro || LINEAR || — || align=right | 4.1 km || 
|-id=886 bgcolor=#E9E9E9
| 82886 ||  || — || August 17, 2001 || Socorro || LINEAR || — || align=right | 4.0 km || 
|-id=887 bgcolor=#E9E9E9
| 82887 ||  || — || August 17, 2001 || Socorro || LINEAR || — || align=right | 2.6 km || 
|-id=888 bgcolor=#d6d6d6
| 82888 ||  || — || August 17, 2001 || Socorro || LINEAR || EOS || align=right | 6.4 km || 
|-id=889 bgcolor=#E9E9E9
| 82889 ||  || — || August 17, 2001 || Socorro || LINEAR || — || align=right | 4.1 km || 
|-id=890 bgcolor=#d6d6d6
| 82890 ||  || — || August 17, 2001 || Socorro || LINEAR || — || align=right | 8.9 km || 
|-id=891 bgcolor=#E9E9E9
| 82891 ||  || — || August 17, 2001 || Socorro || LINEAR || — || align=right | 4.6 km || 
|-id=892 bgcolor=#E9E9E9
| 82892 ||  || — || August 16, 2001 || Palomar || NEAT || — || align=right | 2.8 km || 
|-id=893 bgcolor=#E9E9E9
| 82893 ||  || — || August 16, 2001 || Palomar || NEAT || JUN || align=right | 1.9 km || 
|-id=894 bgcolor=#d6d6d6
| 82894 ||  || — || August 17, 2001 || Palomar || NEAT || — || align=right | 8.4 km || 
|-id=895 bgcolor=#E9E9E9
| 82895 ||  || — || August 17, 2001 || Palomar || NEAT || HNS || align=right | 3.0 km || 
|-id=896 bgcolor=#E9E9E9
| 82896 Vaubaillon ||  ||  || August 22, 2001 || Pic du Midi || Pic du Midi Obs. || — || align=right | 4.1 km || 
|-id=897 bgcolor=#d6d6d6
| 82897 ||  || — || August 16, 2001 || Palomar || NEAT || — || align=right | 5.7 km || 
|-id=898 bgcolor=#fefefe
| 82898 ||  || — || August 16, 2001 || Palomar || NEAT || — || align=right | 2.1 km || 
|-id=899 bgcolor=#E9E9E9
| 82899 ||  || — || August 22, 2001 || Socorro || LINEAR || PAL || align=right | 6.7 km || 
|-id=900 bgcolor=#E9E9E9
| 82900 ||  || — || August 23, 2001 || Desert Eagle || W. K. Y. Yeung || AGN || align=right | 3.0 km || 
|}

82901–83000 

|-bgcolor=#E9E9E9
| 82901 ||  || — || August 23, 2001 || Desert Eagle || W. K. Y. Yeung || WAT || align=right | 5.4 km || 
|-id=902 bgcolor=#E9E9E9
| 82902 ||  || — || August 16, 2001 || Socorro || LINEAR || — || align=right | 2.1 km || 
|-id=903 bgcolor=#E9E9E9
| 82903 ||  || — || August 17, 2001 || Socorro || LINEAR || — || align=right | 5.2 km || 
|-id=904 bgcolor=#E9E9E9
| 82904 ||  || — || August 19, 2001 || Socorro || LINEAR || — || align=right | 2.0 km || 
|-id=905 bgcolor=#d6d6d6
| 82905 ||  || — || August 20, 2001 || Socorro || LINEAR || EOS || align=right | 6.0 km || 
|-id=906 bgcolor=#d6d6d6
| 82906 ||  || — || August 22, 2001 || Socorro || LINEAR || EMA || align=right | 12 km || 
|-id=907 bgcolor=#fefefe
| 82907 ||  || — || August 18, 2001 || Palomar || NEAT || V || align=right | 1.4 km || 
|-id=908 bgcolor=#fefefe
| 82908 ||  || — || August 19, 2001 || Ondřejov || P. Kušnirák, U. Babiaková || — || align=right | 1.9 km || 
|-id=909 bgcolor=#E9E9E9
| 82909 ||  || — || August 19, 2001 || Haleakala || NEAT || — || align=right | 3.6 km || 
|-id=910 bgcolor=#E9E9E9
| 82910 ||  || — || August 19, 2001 || Haleakala || NEAT || GEF || align=right | 2.7 km || 
|-id=911 bgcolor=#E9E9E9
| 82911 ||  || — || August 18, 2001 || Socorro || LINEAR || HOF || align=right | 5.8 km || 
|-id=912 bgcolor=#E9E9E9
| 82912 ||  || — || August 19, 2001 || Socorro || LINEAR || — || align=right | 3.2 km || 
|-id=913 bgcolor=#FA8072
| 82913 ||  || — || August 19, 2001 || Socorro || LINEAR || — || align=right | 2.9 km || 
|-id=914 bgcolor=#E9E9E9
| 82914 ||  || — || August 19, 2001 || Socorro || LINEAR || EUN || align=right | 3.1 km || 
|-id=915 bgcolor=#d6d6d6
| 82915 ||  || — || August 20, 2001 || Socorro || LINEAR || — || align=right | 8.1 km || 
|-id=916 bgcolor=#fefefe
| 82916 ||  || — || August 20, 2001 || Socorro || LINEAR || NYS || align=right | 1.4 km || 
|-id=917 bgcolor=#E9E9E9
| 82917 ||  || — || August 20, 2001 || Socorro || LINEAR || HEN || align=right | 2.6 km || 
|-id=918 bgcolor=#d6d6d6
| 82918 ||  || — || August 22, 2001 || Socorro || LINEAR || — || align=right | 3.7 km || 
|-id=919 bgcolor=#d6d6d6
| 82919 ||  || — || August 18, 2001 || Anderson Mesa || LONEOS || — || align=right | 5.1 km || 
|-id=920 bgcolor=#d6d6d6
| 82920 ||  || — || August 18, 2001 || Anderson Mesa || LONEOS || — || align=right | 6.1 km || 
|-id=921 bgcolor=#fefefe
| 82921 ||  || — || August 18, 2001 || Anderson Mesa || LONEOS || — || align=right | 2.7 km || 
|-id=922 bgcolor=#d6d6d6
| 82922 ||  || — || August 23, 2001 || Anderson Mesa || LONEOS || THM || align=right | 4.2 km || 
|-id=923 bgcolor=#d6d6d6
| 82923 ||  || — || August 20, 2001 || Haleakala || NEAT || EOS || align=right | 4.2 km || 
|-id=924 bgcolor=#E9E9E9
| 82924 ||  || — || August 24, 2001 || Palomar || NEAT || — || align=right | 2.5 km || 
|-id=925 bgcolor=#E9E9E9
| 82925 ||  || — || August 24, 2001 || Palomar || NEAT || — || align=right | 4.9 km || 
|-id=926 bgcolor=#E9E9E9
| 82926 Jacquey ||  ||  || August 25, 2001 || Pises || Pises Obs. || — || align=right | 4.1 km || 
|-id=927 bgcolor=#d6d6d6
| 82927 Ferrucci ||  ||  || August 25, 2001 || San Marcello || L. Tesi, A. Boattini || — || align=right | 7.1 km || 
|-id=928 bgcolor=#E9E9E9
| 82928 ||  || — || August 19, 2001 || Ondřejov || P. Kušnirák, P. Pravec || WIT || align=right | 2.0 km || 
|-id=929 bgcolor=#d6d6d6
| 82929 ||  || — || August 20, 2001 || Ondřejov || P. Pravec, P. Kušnirák || EOS || align=right | 4.0 km || 
|-id=930 bgcolor=#E9E9E9
| 82930 ||  || — || August 24, 2001 || Ondřejov || P. Kušnirák, P. Pravec || — || align=right | 3.6 km || 
|-id=931 bgcolor=#d6d6d6
| 82931 ||  || — || August 25, 2001 || Socorro || LINEAR || — || align=right | 3.9 km || 
|-id=932 bgcolor=#d6d6d6
| 82932 ||  || — || August 25, 2001 || Socorro || LINEAR || — || align=right | 3.8 km || 
|-id=933 bgcolor=#d6d6d6
| 82933 ||  || — || August 25, 2001 || Socorro || LINEAR || EOS || align=right | 6.5 km || 
|-id=934 bgcolor=#d6d6d6
| 82934 ||  || — || August 25, 2001 || Socorro || LINEAR || — || align=right | 5.4 km || 
|-id=935 bgcolor=#d6d6d6
| 82935 ||  || — || August 25, 2001 || Socorro || LINEAR || — || align=right | 5.2 km || 
|-id=936 bgcolor=#d6d6d6
| 82936 ||  || — || August 25, 2001 || Desert Eagle || W. K. Y. Yeung || EOS || align=right | 4.7 km || 
|-id=937 bgcolor=#d6d6d6
| 82937 Lesicki ||  ||  || August 26, 2001 || Ondřejov || P. Pravec, P. Kušnirák || ALA || align=right | 7.0 km || 
|-id=938 bgcolor=#fefefe
| 82938 ||  || — || August 17, 2001 || Socorro || LINEAR || V || align=right | 1.6 km || 
|-id=939 bgcolor=#d6d6d6
| 82939 ||  || — || August 17, 2001 || Socorro || LINEAR || EOS || align=right | 4.9 km || 
|-id=940 bgcolor=#E9E9E9
| 82940 ||  || — || August 17, 2001 || Socorro || LINEAR || MAR || align=right | 2.3 km || 
|-id=941 bgcolor=#E9E9E9
| 82941 ||  || — || August 17, 2001 || Socorro || LINEAR || — || align=right | 2.6 km || 
|-id=942 bgcolor=#E9E9E9
| 82942 ||  || — || August 17, 2001 || Socorro || LINEAR || GEF || align=right | 3.6 km || 
|-id=943 bgcolor=#d6d6d6
| 82943 ||  || — || August 17, 2001 || Socorro || LINEAR || — || align=right | 6.4 km || 
|-id=944 bgcolor=#E9E9E9
| 82944 ||  || — || August 17, 2001 || Socorro || LINEAR || EUN || align=right | 3.5 km || 
|-id=945 bgcolor=#d6d6d6
| 82945 ||  || — || August 17, 2001 || Socorro || LINEAR || EOS || align=right | 4.6 km || 
|-id=946 bgcolor=#d6d6d6
| 82946 ||  || — || August 18, 2001 || Socorro || LINEAR || EOS || align=right | 4.6 km || 
|-id=947 bgcolor=#d6d6d6
| 82947 ||  || — || August 19, 2001 || Socorro || LINEAR || — || align=right | 5.2 km || 
|-id=948 bgcolor=#fefefe
| 82948 ||  || — || August 19, 2001 || Socorro || LINEAR || NYS || align=right | 1.3 km || 
|-id=949 bgcolor=#d6d6d6
| 82949 ||  || — || August 19, 2001 || Socorro || LINEAR || HYG || align=right | 5.2 km || 
|-id=950 bgcolor=#E9E9E9
| 82950 ||  || — || August 19, 2001 || Socorro || LINEAR || PAD || align=right | 4.8 km || 
|-id=951 bgcolor=#d6d6d6
| 82951 ||  || — || August 19, 2001 || Socorro || LINEAR || EOS || align=right | 3.8 km || 
|-id=952 bgcolor=#d6d6d6
| 82952 ||  || — || August 19, 2001 || Socorro || LINEAR || — || align=right | 4.9 km || 
|-id=953 bgcolor=#d6d6d6
| 82953 ||  || — || August 20, 2001 || Socorro || LINEAR || — || align=right | 9.2 km || 
|-id=954 bgcolor=#d6d6d6
| 82954 ||  || — || August 20, 2001 || Socorro || LINEAR || — || align=right | 7.7 km || 
|-id=955 bgcolor=#E9E9E9
| 82955 ||  || — || August 20, 2001 || Socorro || LINEAR || BRG || align=right | 3.6 km || 
|-id=956 bgcolor=#E9E9E9
| 82956 ||  || — || August 20, 2001 || Socorro || LINEAR || MAR || align=right | 2.5 km || 
|-id=957 bgcolor=#d6d6d6
| 82957 ||  || — || August 20, 2001 || Socorro || LINEAR || — || align=right | 4.8 km || 
|-id=958 bgcolor=#d6d6d6
| 82958 ||  || — || August 20, 2001 || Socorro || LINEAR || — || align=right | 8.5 km || 
|-id=959 bgcolor=#d6d6d6
| 82959 ||  || — || August 20, 2001 || Socorro || LINEAR || — || align=right | 9.7 km || 
|-id=960 bgcolor=#E9E9E9
| 82960 ||  || — || August 20, 2001 || Socorro || LINEAR || EUN || align=right | 2.8 km || 
|-id=961 bgcolor=#d6d6d6
| 82961 ||  || — || August 20, 2001 || Socorro || LINEAR || VER || align=right | 6.9 km || 
|-id=962 bgcolor=#E9E9E9
| 82962 ||  || — || August 20, 2001 || Socorro || LINEAR || — || align=right | 2.7 km || 
|-id=963 bgcolor=#d6d6d6
| 82963 ||  || — || August 20, 2001 || Socorro || LINEAR || EOS || align=right | 4.3 km || 
|-id=964 bgcolor=#d6d6d6
| 82964 ||  || — || August 20, 2001 || Socorro || LINEAR || EOS || align=right | 5.1 km || 
|-id=965 bgcolor=#d6d6d6
| 82965 ||  || — || August 20, 2001 || Socorro || LINEAR || EOS || align=right | 4.6 km || 
|-id=966 bgcolor=#E9E9E9
| 82966 ||  || — || August 20, 2001 || Socorro || LINEAR || — || align=right | 2.9 km || 
|-id=967 bgcolor=#d6d6d6
| 82967 ||  || — || August 20, 2001 || Socorro || LINEAR || EOS || align=right | 5.6 km || 
|-id=968 bgcolor=#E9E9E9
| 82968 ||  || — || August 21, 2001 || Socorro || LINEAR || — || align=right | 2.2 km || 
|-id=969 bgcolor=#fefefe
| 82969 ||  || — || August 21, 2001 || Socorro || LINEAR || — || align=right | 1.9 km || 
|-id=970 bgcolor=#E9E9E9
| 82970 ||  || — || August 22, 2001 || Socorro || LINEAR || DOR || align=right | 7.4 km || 
|-id=971 bgcolor=#d6d6d6
| 82971 ||  || — || August 22, 2001 || Socorro || LINEAR || ALA || align=right | 7.3 km || 
|-id=972 bgcolor=#E9E9E9
| 82972 ||  || — || August 22, 2001 || Socorro || LINEAR || MAR || align=right | 3.3 km || 
|-id=973 bgcolor=#E9E9E9
| 82973 ||  || — || August 22, 2001 || Socorro || LINEAR || EUN || align=right | 3.4 km || 
|-id=974 bgcolor=#d6d6d6
| 82974 ||  || — || August 22, 2001 || Socorro || LINEAR || TEL || align=right | 3.2 km || 
|-id=975 bgcolor=#d6d6d6
| 82975 ||  || — || August 22, 2001 || Socorro || LINEAR || — || align=right | 5.2 km || 
|-id=976 bgcolor=#E9E9E9
| 82976 ||  || — || August 22, 2001 || Socorro || LINEAR || — || align=right | 3.0 km || 
|-id=977 bgcolor=#E9E9E9
| 82977 ||  || — || August 22, 2001 || Socorro || LINEAR || ADE || align=right | 5.6 km || 
|-id=978 bgcolor=#fefefe
| 82978 ||  || — || August 24, 2001 || Socorro || LINEAR || MAS || align=right | 1.7 km || 
|-id=979 bgcolor=#d6d6d6
| 82979 ||  || — || August 24, 2001 || Socorro || LINEAR || — || align=right | 6.6 km || 
|-id=980 bgcolor=#d6d6d6
| 82980 ||  || — || August 21, 2001 || Kitt Peak || Spacewatch || — || align=right | 3.7 km || 
|-id=981 bgcolor=#d6d6d6
| 82981 ||  || — || August 21, 2001 || Kitt Peak || Spacewatch || — || align=right | 4.9 km || 
|-id=982 bgcolor=#d6d6d6
| 82982 ||  || — || August 21, 2001 || Kitt Peak || Spacewatch || TEL || align=right | 7.2 km || 
|-id=983 bgcolor=#d6d6d6
| 82983 ||  || — || August 21, 2001 || Kitt Peak || Spacewatch || — || align=right | 7.0 km || 
|-id=984 bgcolor=#d6d6d6
| 82984 ||  || — || August 20, 2001 || Palomar || NEAT || — || align=right | 6.9 km || 
|-id=985 bgcolor=#d6d6d6
| 82985 ||  || — || August 20, 2001 || Palomar || NEAT || — || align=right | 4.6 km || 
|-id=986 bgcolor=#d6d6d6
| 82986 ||  || — || August 20, 2001 || Palomar || NEAT || — || align=right | 7.5 km || 
|-id=987 bgcolor=#E9E9E9
| 82987 ||  || — || August 20, 2001 || Palomar || NEAT || — || align=right | 2.8 km || 
|-id=988 bgcolor=#d6d6d6
| 82988 ||  || — || August 20, 2001 || Palomar || NEAT || — || align=right | 6.8 km || 
|-id=989 bgcolor=#d6d6d6
| 82989 ||  || — || August 20, 2001 || Haleakala || NEAT || TEL || align=right | 3.3 km || 
|-id=990 bgcolor=#d6d6d6
| 82990 ||  || — || August 25, 2001 || Desert Eagle || W. K. Y. Yeung || KOR || align=right | 4.7 km || 
|-id=991 bgcolor=#E9E9E9
| 82991 ||  || — || August 27, 2001 || Socorro || LINEAR || — || align=right | 6.3 km || 
|-id=992 bgcolor=#E9E9E9
| 82992 ||  || — || August 27, 2001 || Goodricke-Pigott || R. A. Tucker || PAD || align=right | 7.1 km || 
|-id=993 bgcolor=#d6d6d6
| 82993 ||  || — || August 28, 2001 || Desert Eagle || W. K. Y. Yeung || — || align=right | 7.7 km || 
|-id=994 bgcolor=#E9E9E9
| 82994 ||  || — || August 30, 2001 || Desert Eagle || W. K. Y. Yeung || — || align=right | 4.9 km || 
|-id=995 bgcolor=#d6d6d6
| 82995 ||  || — || August 23, 2001 || Anderson Mesa || LONEOS || — || align=right | 6.3 km || 
|-id=996 bgcolor=#E9E9E9
| 82996 ||  || — || August 23, 2001 || Anderson Mesa || LONEOS || — || align=right | 2.3 km || 
|-id=997 bgcolor=#fefefe
| 82997 ||  || — || August 23, 2001 || Anderson Mesa || LONEOS || FLO || align=right | 1.5 km || 
|-id=998 bgcolor=#E9E9E9
| 82998 ||  || — || August 23, 2001 || Anderson Mesa || LONEOS || GEF || align=right | 2.7 km || 
|-id=999 bgcolor=#fefefe
| 82999 ||  || — || August 23, 2001 || Anderson Mesa || LONEOS || NYS || align=right | 1.6 km || 
|-id=000 bgcolor=#d6d6d6
| 83000 ||  || — || August 23, 2001 || Anderson Mesa || LONEOS || — || align=right | 7.5 km || 
|}

References

External links 
 Discovery Circumstances: Numbered Minor Planets (80001)–(85000) (IAU Minor Planet Center)

0082